= Demir Dragnev =

Moldovan historian (born 1936)

Member of the Commission for the Study of the Communist Dictatorship in Moldova
- In office 14 January 2010 – 2 July 2010

Personal details
- Born: 27 July 1936 (age 90) Cureşniţa, Soroca District
- Education: Moldova State University
- Profession: Historian

Demir Dragnev (born 27 July 1936) is a historian from the Republic of Moldova.

== Biography ==
Demir Dragnev was born on 27 July 1936 in Cureşniţa. He is a member of the Commission for the Study of the Communist Dictatorship in Moldova.

== Awards ==
- Premiul de Stat,
- Ordinul „Gloria Muncii”,
- Medal Academy of Sciences of Moldova „D. Cantemir”.
- Honorary citizenship of the Moldovan town of Soroca
