= Nicolae Bulat =

Moldovan historian (1952–2022)

Nicolae Bulat OR
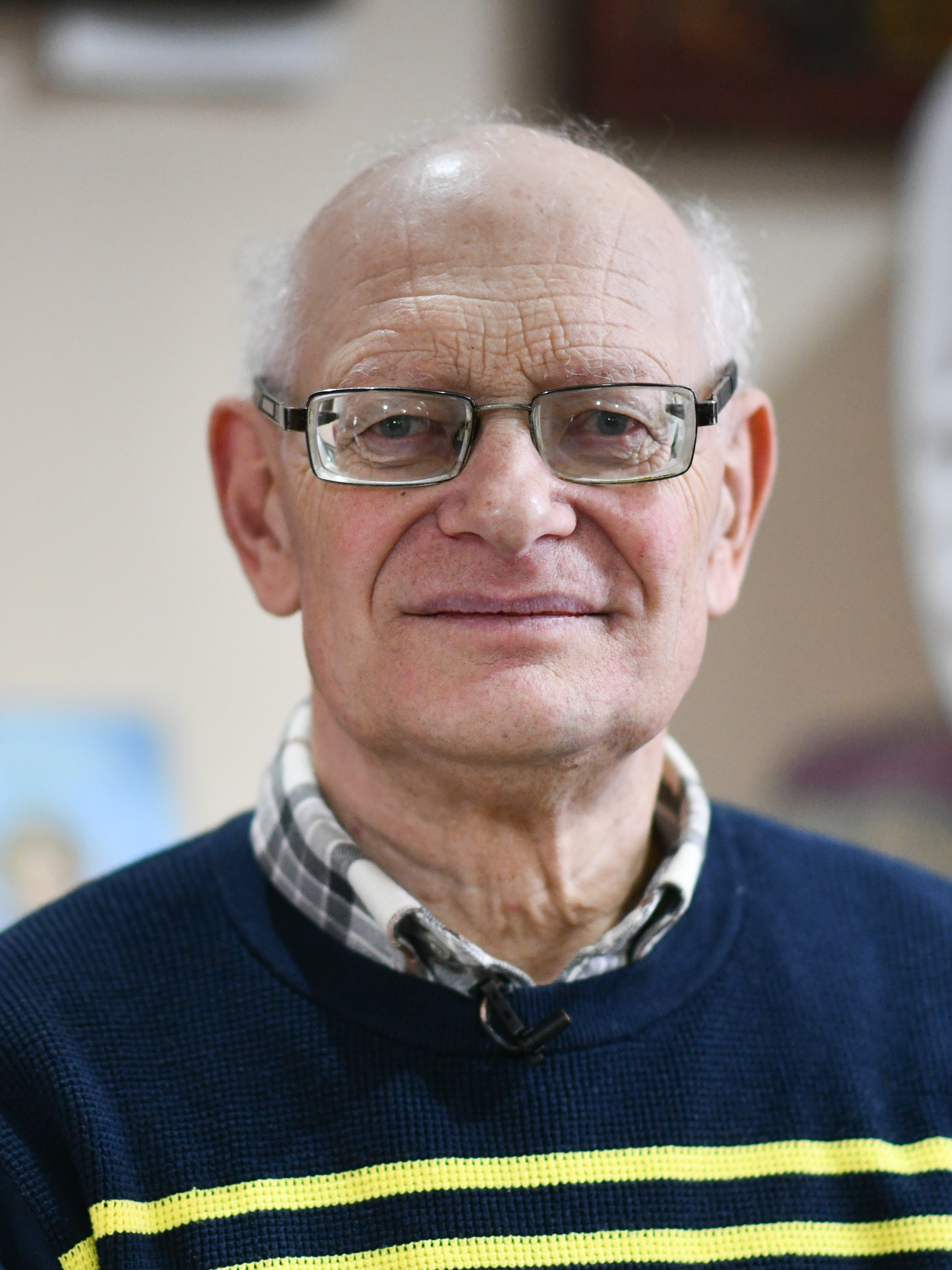
- Bulat in 2022
- Born: 10 February 1952; Cureșnița, Moldavian SSR, Soviet Union
- Died: 9 September 2022 (aged 70); Iaşi, Romania
- Education: Moldova State University
- Occupation: Curator
- Known for: Director Soroca Museum of History
- Parent(s): Daria and Andronie Bulat
- Awards: Order of the Star of Romania

Nicolae Bulat (10 February 1952 – 9 September 2022) was a Moldovan historian and director of Soroca Museum of History and Ethnography (including Soroca Fortress).

Bulat was a candidate of the Liberal Democratic Party of Moldova in April 2009 and July 2009.

== Biography ==
Nicolae Bulat was born on 10 February 1952 in the Cureșnița village, Soroca District. He graduated from the secondary school № 1 from Soroca, and then entered the Moldova State University from Chișinău at the Faculty of Foreign Languages, a section of English language and literature.

Bulat was often called the guardian of the Soroca Fortress, in which he had been working for more than 30 years, he was considered one of the best guides in Moldova.

== Awards ==
- Order of the Star of Romania, 2000.
