= Cosăuți–Yampil Bridge =

- Coordinates: 48°07′32″N 28°08′38″E
- Carries: M2 highway (Moldova)
- Crosses: Dniester River, Moldova–Ukraine border
- Locale: Cosăuți. Yampil

Characteristics
- Total length: 0.641 km (0.4 mi)

History
- Constructed by: Autostrada

Location
- Interactive map of Cosăuți–Yampil Bridge

The Cosăuți–Yampil Bridge is an incomplete international road bridge across the Dniester River under construction on the Moldova–Ukraine border. When completed, the crossing will connect Cosăuți, Moldova and Yampil, Ukraine.

The bridge was designed to replace the Cosăuți–Yampil ferry crossing, which ceased operating in 2021 due to safety and technical concerns. The Ukrainian infrastructure development company Autostrada was contracted to oversee the project. The agreement to design and build the bridge, signed between the two countries was made in June 2023 and replacing an earlier agreement made in 2021, specified the construction of a 1,400 metres (4,600 ft) bridge with two lanes and pavements, access roads, and checkpoints. Construction was planned for completion in 2025.

In September 2026, construction work was suspended; the Ukrainian Verkhovna Rada confirmed that further capital expenditure would be postponed until at least December 2026.

== Soviet-era ferry ==
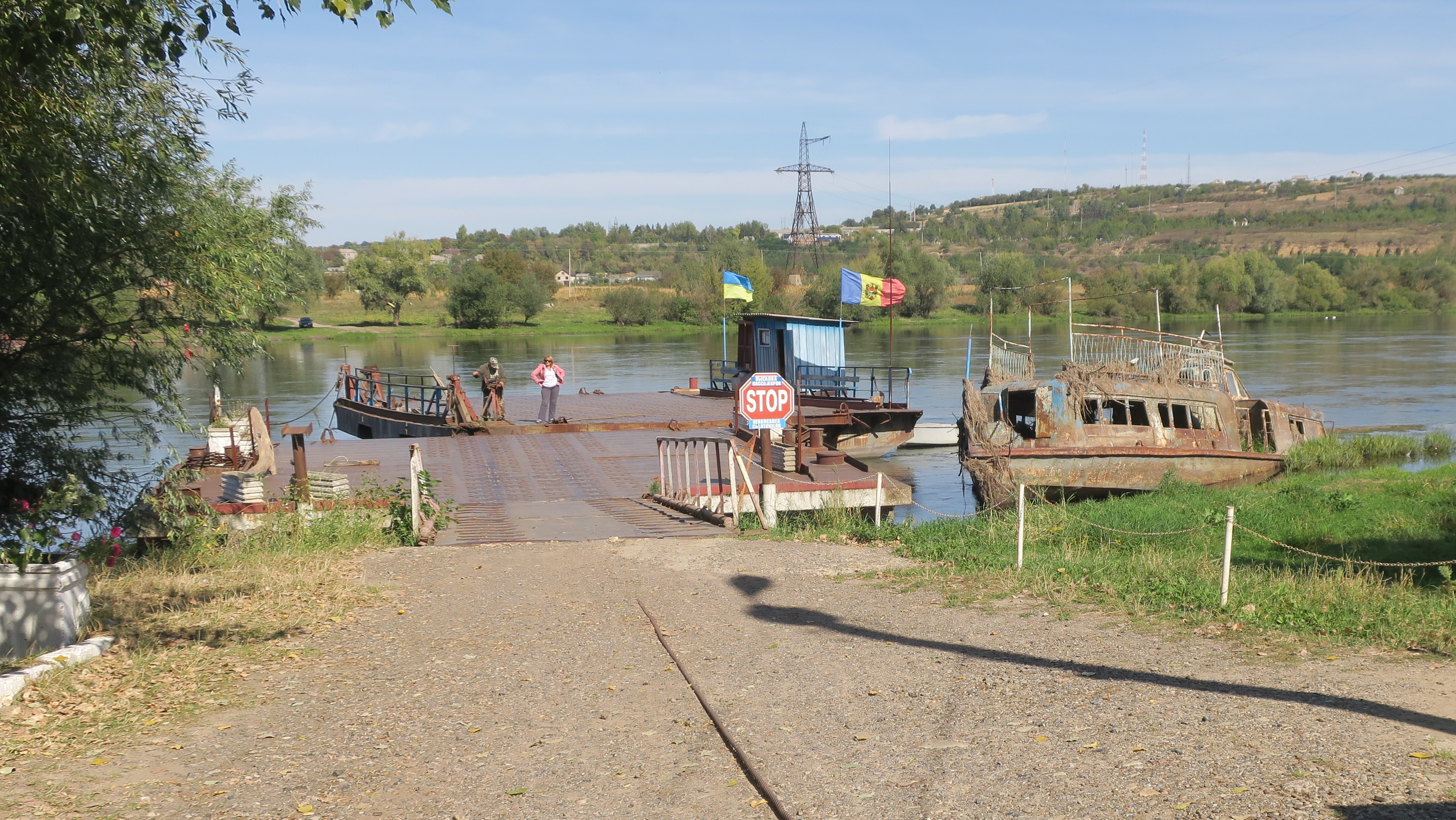
The old ferry crossing at Cosăuți-Yampil in 2019

The primary border crossing between Cosăuți, Moldova and Yampil, Ukraine was previously served by a Soviet-era ferry, crossing the Dniester River.. The ferry was limited to operating in daylight with calm weather, and was regularly put out of service by technical issues. In 2021, the ferry crossing was closed by the authorities, who cited critical safety and technical concerns.

Alternatives to the ferry at Cosăuți are another ferry crossing in similarly poor condition at Soroca, or the limited capacity road and rail crossings some distance away in Mohyliv-Podil's'kyi.

== Planning ==
In June 2023, an agreement on the construction of a new bridge was signed by Oleksandr Kubrakov, the Ukrainian Minister of Infrastructure, and the Moldovan secretary general of the Ministry of Infrastructure and Regional Development, Lilia Dabija. The agreement developed an earlier agreement made in 2021, specifying the construction of a 1,400 metres (4,600 ft) bridge with two lanes and pavements. The Government of Ukraine undertook to finance both the design and construction of the bridge, together with the border checkpoint on the Ukrainian side. Moldova agreed to build a series of access roads, and the checkpoint on its side. Construction was planned for completion in 2025.

== Construction of a temporary bridge ==
The temporary bridge in July 2026, prior to work being halted

In July 2026, Autostrada reported that 96 metres (315 ft) of a 276-metre-long (906 ft) temporary bridge had been built. By late August, 120 metres (390 ft) of the bridge had been built, with 11 out of 24 columns in place, reaching the thalweg (line of lowest elevation) of the Dniester valley. It was reported that work on a 3 kilometres (1.9 mi) access road on the Ukrainian side was underway.

== Halt to construction ==
In mid September 2026, Autostrada suspended construction work on all its projects, including the Cosăuți–Yampil Bridge, due to a halt in funding from the Ukrainian government. The halt was confirmed by Autostrada founder Maxim Shkil, in a Facebook post on 17 September. Previously in May–June 2026, the company had threatened to halt construction and repair work, stating that the state debt owed to Autostrada exceeded 6 billion UAH. The halt in work followed reports from the Ukrainian Minister of Finance Serhiy Marchenko, stating that the state had been forced to limit government spending due to delays in international financial aid. On 17 September 2026, the chairman of the Budget Committee of the Verkhovna Rada, Roksolana Pidlasa confirmed that further capital expenditure would be postponed until at least December 2026.
