= Elena Bodnarenco =

Moldovan politician (1965–2022)

Member of the Moldovan Parliament
- In office 23 July 2021 – 4 July 2022
- Succeeded by: Adrian Albu
- Parliamentary group: Bloc of Communists and Socialists
- In office 9 December 2014 – 9 March 2019
- Parliamentary group: Party of Communists
- In office 17 March 2005 – 5 June 2011
- Succeeded by: Igor Vremea
- Parliamentary group: Party of Communists

Mayor of Soroca
- In office 5 June 2011 – January 2015
- Preceded by: Victor Său
- Succeeded by: Victor Său

Personal details
- Born: 5 March 1965 Soroca, Moldavian SSR, Soviet Union
- Died: 4 July 2022 (aged 57) Chișinău, Moldova
- Education: Academy of Public Administration of Moldova

Elena Bodnarenco (5 March 1965 – 4 July 2022) was a Moldovan politician. A member of the Party of Communists of the Republic of Moldova, she served in the Parliament from 2005 to 2011, 2014 to 2019, and again from 2021 to 2022.

Bodnarenco died of cancer in Chișinău on 4 July 2022 at the age of 57.
