= Friedrich von der Groeben =

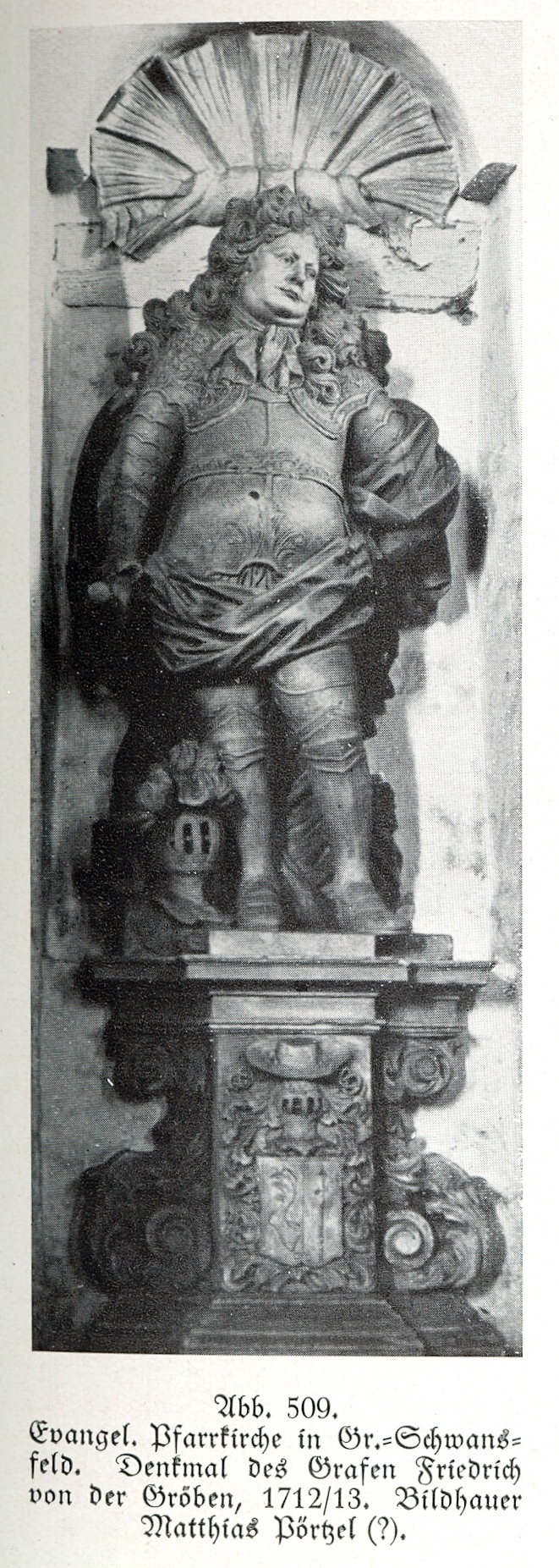
- Statue at the church in Łabędnik
- Born: 1645
- Died: 1712
- Allegiance: Polish–Lithuanian Commonwealth
- Rank: Lieutenant general
- Battles / wars: Polish–Ottoman War (1683–1699)

Friedrich von der Groeben (1645–1712) was a Prussian aristocrat and Royal-Polish Lieutenant-General, and commander of the Foreign Legion of King John III Sobieski in the Battle of Vienna.

== Career ==
Von der Groeben joined the Foreign Legion or German Infantry in Polish military service about 1670 and became a lieutenant colonel in 1675 and by the end of the same year its commander and colonel. After John III Sobieski became King of Poland in 1674 he sent von der Groeben with diplomatic tasks to the Tatars and to the Ottoman Empire to find out as much as possible about the enemy's political and military intentions.

In the Battle of Vienna he captured a pompous Turkish tent, which is claimed to have been the official tent of Kara Mustafa Pasha. The tent was stored at the manor of Groß Schwansfeld (Łabędnik), an estate von der Groeben bought in 1686, till 1907, when it came to the exhibitions of the Berlin Zeughaus. Today it is part of the display of the Deutsches Historisches Museum.

In 1687 he was promoted to General Major and Sobieski entrusted him with other military operations like the incident at Esztergom, several Moldavian campaigns in 1684-86 and the capture of the fortresses of Soroca and Neamț in 1691.

Von der Groeben became a General Lieutenant in 1693 and remained in Polish service after Sobieski's death in 1696, now representing the diplomatic interests of Brandenburg-Prussia at the Polish court.
