= Pîrlița =

Pîrliţa may refer to several places in Moldova:

- Pîrliţa, Făleşti, a commune in Fălești District
- Pîrliţa, Soroca, a commune in Soroca District
- Pîrliţa, Ungheni, a commune in Ungheni District

== See also ==
- Pârlita (disambiguation)
