= Romulus Cioflec =

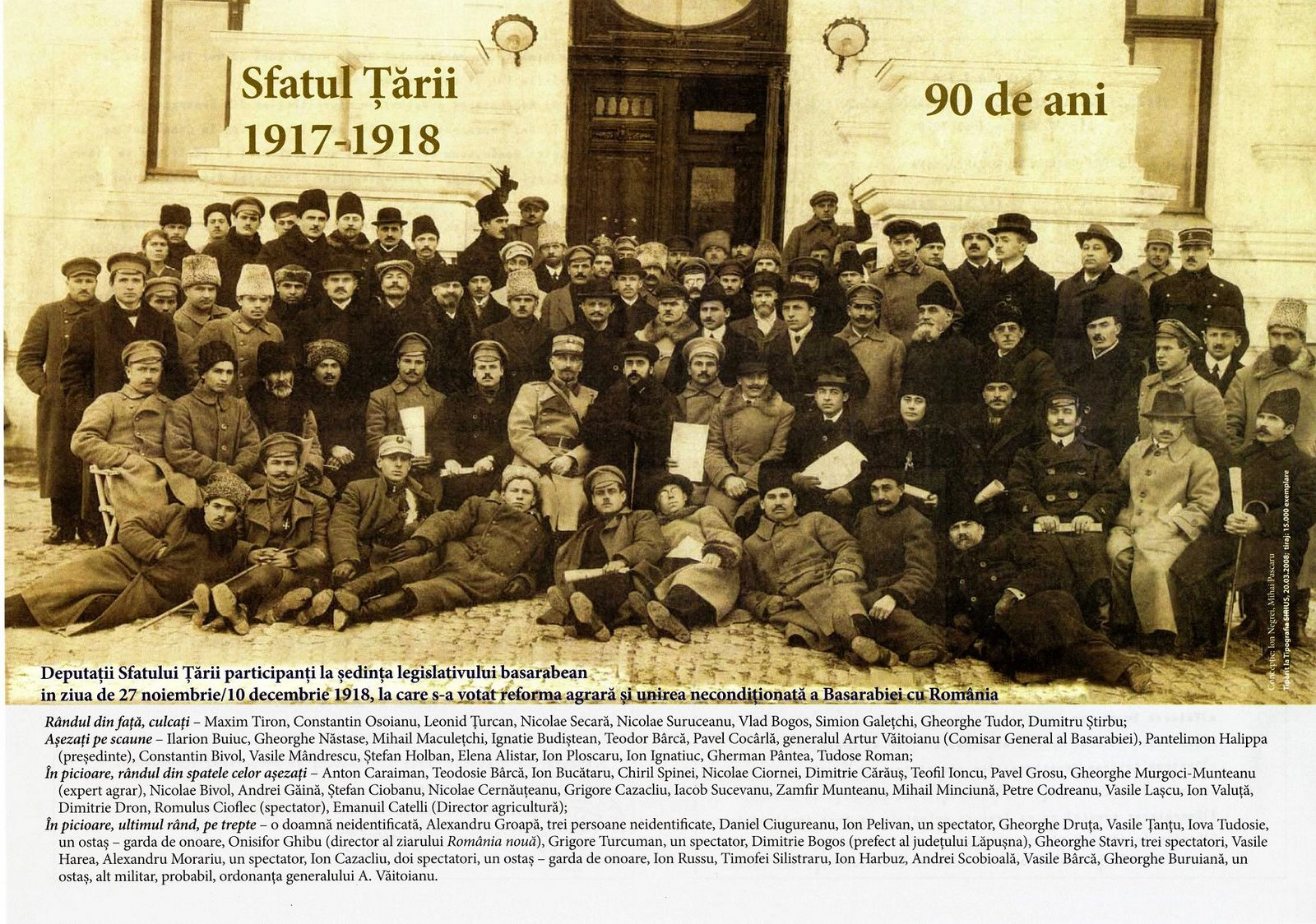
- Born: April 1, 1882; Araci, Vâlcele, Covasna
- Died: November 13, 1955 (aged 73)
- Occupation: Lawyer
- Known for: Journalistic activity
- Spouse: Antonia daughter of Emanuil Gavriliţă
- Relatives: Emanuil Gavriliţă
- Awards: "Ion Heliade Rădulescu" Prize of the Romanian Academy

Romulus Cioflec (April 1, 1882, Araci – November 13, 1955) was a writer, journalist and activist from Romania. He was the editor in chief of Românul in Arad and worked for Cuvânt Moldovenesc, a newspaper from Chişinău, where he lived between 1917 and 1926.

== Biography ==
Romulus Cioflec was born to Maria and Constantin Cioflec on April 1, 1882 in Araci, Vâlcele, Covasna. He attended a school in Câmpulung Muscel, worked for the Romanian Academy (1905–1910) and graduated from University of Bucharest. Cioflec was editor in chief of Românul (1911–1913). He was married to Antonia, a daughter of Emanuil Gavriliţă.

"Romulus Cioflec" Memorial House was purchased in 1998, when the memorial house became the property of the Ministry of Culture and since then was administrated by the Museum of Eastern Carpathians. The memorial house was laid in a relatively short time, with different objects, which even if they did not belong to the writer, manage to re-build the atmosphere from the time Romulus Cioflec activated.

== Awards ==
- "Ion Heliade Rădulescu" Prize of the Romanian Academy

== Honours ==
In his native village, there is a memorial house dedicated to him, as well as a primary school.

== Works ==
- "Pe urmele Basarabiei" (1927),
- "Doamne, ajută-ne!" (1907),
- "Lacrimi călătoare" (1920),
- "Românii din secuime" (1942),
- "Trei Aldămaşe" (postum, 1970)
- "Cutreierând Spania" (1928),
- "Sub soarele polar" (1929)
- "Vârtejul" (1937),
- "Pe urmele destinului" (1943),
- "Boierul", 1957
- Trei aldamase - beletristică
- Moarte cu bucluc
