= Vărăncău =

Vărăncău may refer to several places in Moldova:

- Vărăncău, Soroca, a commune in Soroca district
- Vărăncău, Transnistria, a commune in Transnistria
