= Holoșnița =

- Commune
- Location in Moldova
- Coordinates: 48°15′N 28°11′E
- Country: Moldova
- District: Soroca District
- Elevation: 292 ft (89 m)

Population (2014)
  - Total: 1,208
- Time zone: UTC+2 (EET)
  - Summer (DST): UTC+3 (EEST)
- Post code: MD-3023
- Area code: +373 230

Holoșnița is a commune in Soroca District, Moldova. It is composed of two villages, Cureșnița and Holoșnița.

== Notable people ==
- Nicolae Bulat
- Demir Dragnev

== Gallery ==
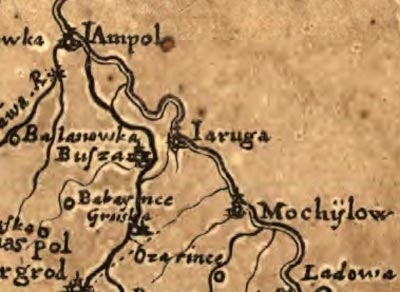
Holoșnița area on Beauplan's map from 1648. South is up, north is down, the river is Dniester.

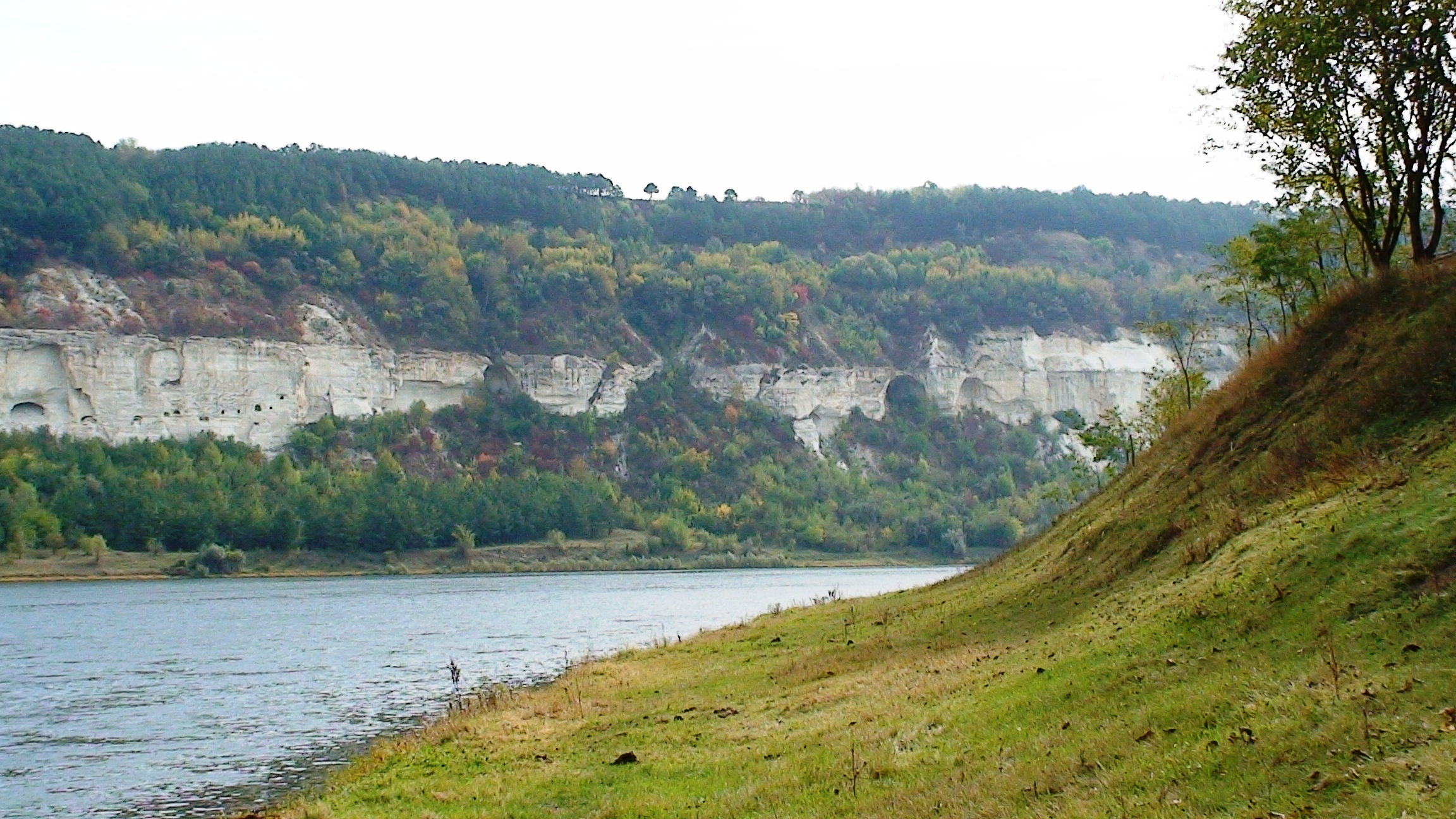
the Dniester at Holoșnița
