= Băxani =

- Commune and village
- Location in Moldova
- Coordinates: 48°07′N 28°06′E
- Country: Moldova
- District: Soroca District
- Elevation: 866 ft (264 m)

Population (2014 census)
  - Total: 758
- Time zone: UTC+2 (EET)
  - Summer (DST): UTC+3 (EEST)
- Postal code: MD-3012
- Area code: +373 230

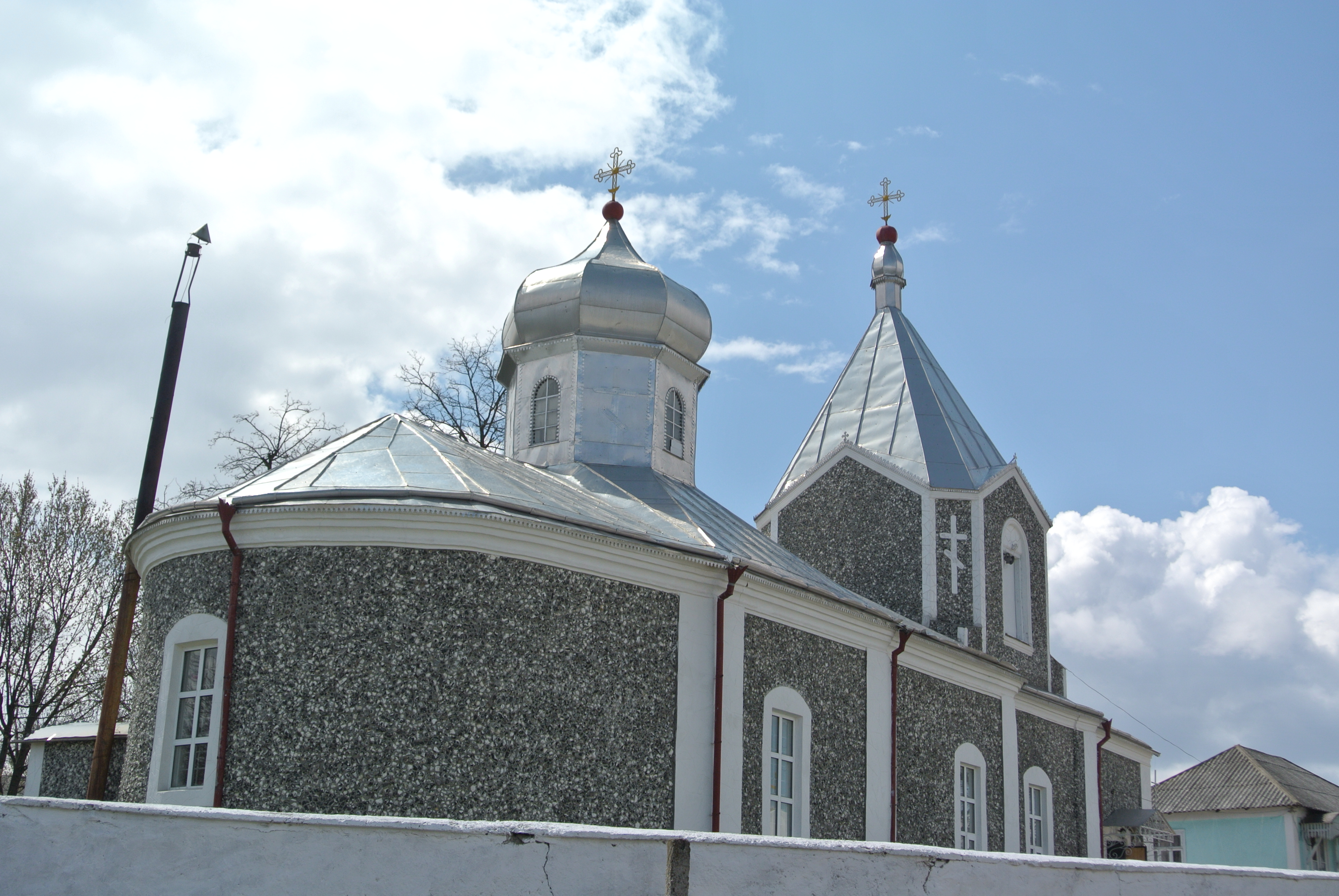

Băxani is a village in Soroca District, Moldova. It is near the Băxani Forest Nature Reserve, which covers 45 hectares.

== Notable people ==
- Emanuil Gavriliță
