= Stoicani =

- Commune
- Location within Moldova
- Coordinates: 48.0266666667°N 28.3638888889°E
- Country: Moldova
- District: Soroca District

Population (2014)
  - Total: 1,202
- Time zone: UTC+2 (EET)
  - Summer (DST): UTC+3 (EEST)

Stoicani is a commune in Soroca District, Moldova. It is composed of two villages, Soloneț and Stoicani.
