= Isaac Kitrosser =

French photographer (1899–1984)

Isaac Kitrosser (27 August 1899 – 10 August 1984) was a Moldovan-born, French fine art photographer, photojournalist, chemical engineer, and inventor of photographic processes.

== Family ==
Isaac Khunovich Kitrosser was born August 27, 1899, in Soroca in Moldova (then Russia), the eldest of three sons of Khuna Isaakovich Kitrosser (1874–1941), who was a landowner and daguerreotype photographer, and Blyuma Moiseevna Kitrosser. His two brothers were Louis and Samuel, who would also become a photographic innovator in the United States with Polaroid Corporation, Itek Corporation, and Cordell Engineering, Inc.

Both his parents were murdered in the Shoah. His father, together with his cousins Osip Moiseevich Kitroser and Grigory Moiseevich Kitroser, was shot to death in the aftermath of the German and Romanian occupation of Soroca in July 1941. His mother was murdered after deportation.

Another of his father's cousins, Berthe Moiseevna Kitroser, was the partner and wife of sculptor Jacques Lipchitz. Modigliani painted the two of them in Jacques and Berthe Lipchitz (1916).

Isaac Kitrosser would marry Eugenia Brodskaya and have a daughter Ariane Kitrosser Scarpa.

== Career ==
=== Pre-war ===
Kitrosser graduated from the Soroca gymnasium in 1916 and the Electrotechnical Institute of the university of Prague, having studied mechanical and electrical engineering. He moved to Paris in 1922 and opened a photographic equipment store, pursuing photography as both scientist and artist. In the 1930s he invented a technique of chromogenic photographs using ultraviolet light and x-rays. With it he produced colorful x-ray photographs of such things as the human hand, flowers, and seahorses.

As early as 1930 Kitrosser used a Leica camera, one of the earliest photojournalists in France to do so. He became a still photographer for filmmaker Abel Gance. His portrait of Gance as Jesus Christ in End of the World (1930) became famous. His work caught the attention of Lucien Vogel, creator of Vu, who hired him for the magazine. In the 1930s his art photography and photojournalism appeared in Paris-Soir as well as Vu.

Kitrosser, nicknamed "Kitro," was a regular in 1930s European magazine newsrooms. Like his fellow photographer Erich Salomon in London, he became well known for discreetly getting behind the scenes photographs, a journalistic vogue of European pre-war weeklies. Subjects that interested him included architecture old and new and politics. He visited Cormeilles-en-Parisis, (Val-d'Oise), to photograph the birthplace and hometown of photographic innovator Louis Daguerre and made abstract photographs of the interior design of Printemps department store and of the Optique exhibit in the Palace of Discoveries of the Paris Exhibition of 1937.

=== Life magazine ===
Kitrosser become a correspondent for Life magazine in 1938. The April 25, 1938 issue published his photographs of Spanish Loyalist refugees in the Pyrenees. The same issue ran a photographic self-portrait, "indulging in his hobby, photographing insects by infrared light," with a brief biography. Photography, to Kitrosser, had always been an opportunity to "immobilize life". Life reported that Kitrosser "is enormously fat and proud of it. Trained as an engineer, he has been a photographer for ten years, but still considers himself an amateur."

Other work in this period included portraits of Luigi Pirandello, 1934 Nobel Prizewinner for literature; local leaders from French colonial Africa (Chad, Sudan, Ivory Coast, Equatorial Africa, Gabon, and Senegal) attending Bastille Day celebrations in France in 1938; and minister Paul Reynaud after a French cabinet meeting.

He covered events such as Édouard Belin, inventor of the Bélinographe wirephoto, speaking at a celebration honoring Louis Daguerre, on stage with movie star Mona Goya; a garden party at Château Saint-Firmin; a strike at Citroën in 1938; and the mobilization of French reservists on September 1, 1938.

At a ball at the US Embassy in Paris on February 1, 1939, he photographed US Ambassador William C. Bullitt; French politicians Joseph Paul-Boncour and Paul Reynaud; American sculptor Jo Davidson; Russian dancer Serge Lifar; and the Duchess of Windsor speaking with Marthe Lahovary, Princess Bibesco.

=== Second World War ===
Kitrosser engaged in the French Resistance during the Second World War. He was arrested by the Gestapo and interned at Septfonds (Tarn-et-Garonne) where he managed to continue as a photographer. His photographs of Septfonds, including "Cérémonie juive dans le camp de Septfonds," were among the first published concentration camp photos after liberation in 1944.

=== Post-war ===
After the war Kitrosser worked on the staff of Paris-Match (1948–1955). His photography illustrated the Bibliothèque de l'amitié, a series of books for young people published by Rageot from 1959, the covers of whose volumes were illustrated by people in real life circumstances. As a chemical engineer, he was a member of the Union of Russian Certified Engineers in France (1968–1978).

He died in Paris August 10, 1984.
