= Cremenciug, Soroca =

Cremenciug
- Commune
- Location within Moldova
- Coordinates: 48.2769444444°N 28.0852777778°E
- Country: Moldova
- District: Soroca

Population (2014)
  - Total: 890
- Time zone: UTC+2 (EET)
  - Summer (DST): UTC+3 (EEST)

Cremenciug is a commune in Soroca District, Moldova. It is composed of four villages: Cremenciug, Livezi, Sobari and Valea.
