= Łabędnik =

- Village
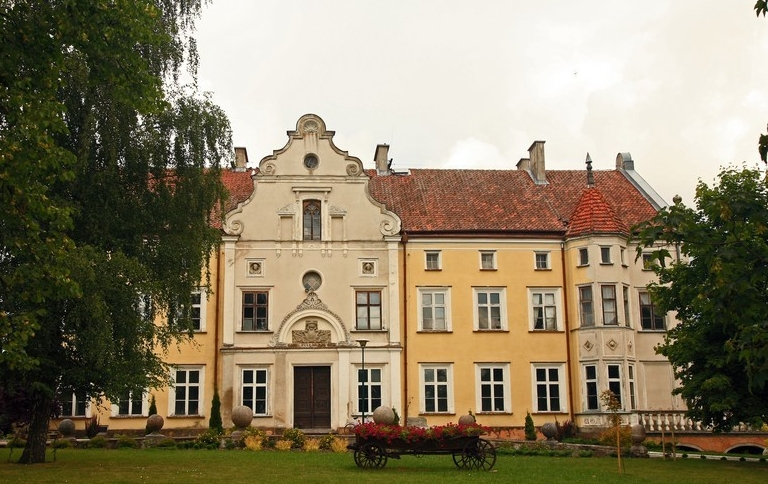
- Manor house

- Location within Poland
- Coordinates: 54°11′4″N 20°58′8″E
- Country: Poland
- Voivodeship: Warmian-Masurian
- County: Bartoszyce
- Gmina: Bartoszyce

Population
  - Total: 470
- Time zone: UTC+1 (CET)
  - Summer (DST): UTC+2 (CEST)
- Vehicle registration: NBA

Łabędnik [waˈbɛndɲik] (German: Groß Schwansfeld) is a village in the administrative district of Gmina Bartoszyce, within Bartoszyce County, Warmian-Masurian Voivodeship, in northern Poland, close to the border with the Kaliningrad Oblast of Russia. It is located in the historic region of Natangia, near the border with Warmia.

In 1686, the village was purchased by Royal-Polish Lieutenant General Friedrich von der Groeben. An ornate tent of a Turkish pasha seized during the Battle of Vienna of 1683 under the command of King John III Sobieski was kept at the estate.
