= Oclanda =

- Village
- Location within Moldova
- Coordinates: 48.2891666667°N 28.0602777778°E
- Country: Moldova
- District: Soroca District
- Founded: 1729

Government
  - Mayor: Vladislav Cebotari (PSRM)

Area
  - Total: 13.8 km^{2} (5.3 sq mi)
- Elevation: 123 m (404 ft)

Population (2014 census)
  - Total: 505
- Time zone: UTC+2 (EET)
  - Summer (DST): UTC+3 (EEST)
- Postal code: MD-3027

Oclanda is a village in Soroca District, Moldova.
