= Visoca =

- Coordinates: 48.2469444444°N 27.9225°E
- Country: Moldova
- District: Soroca District

Population (2014 census)
  - Total: 1,732

Visoca is a village in Soroca District, Moldova.
