= Vâlcele, Covasna =

Vâlcele
- Commune
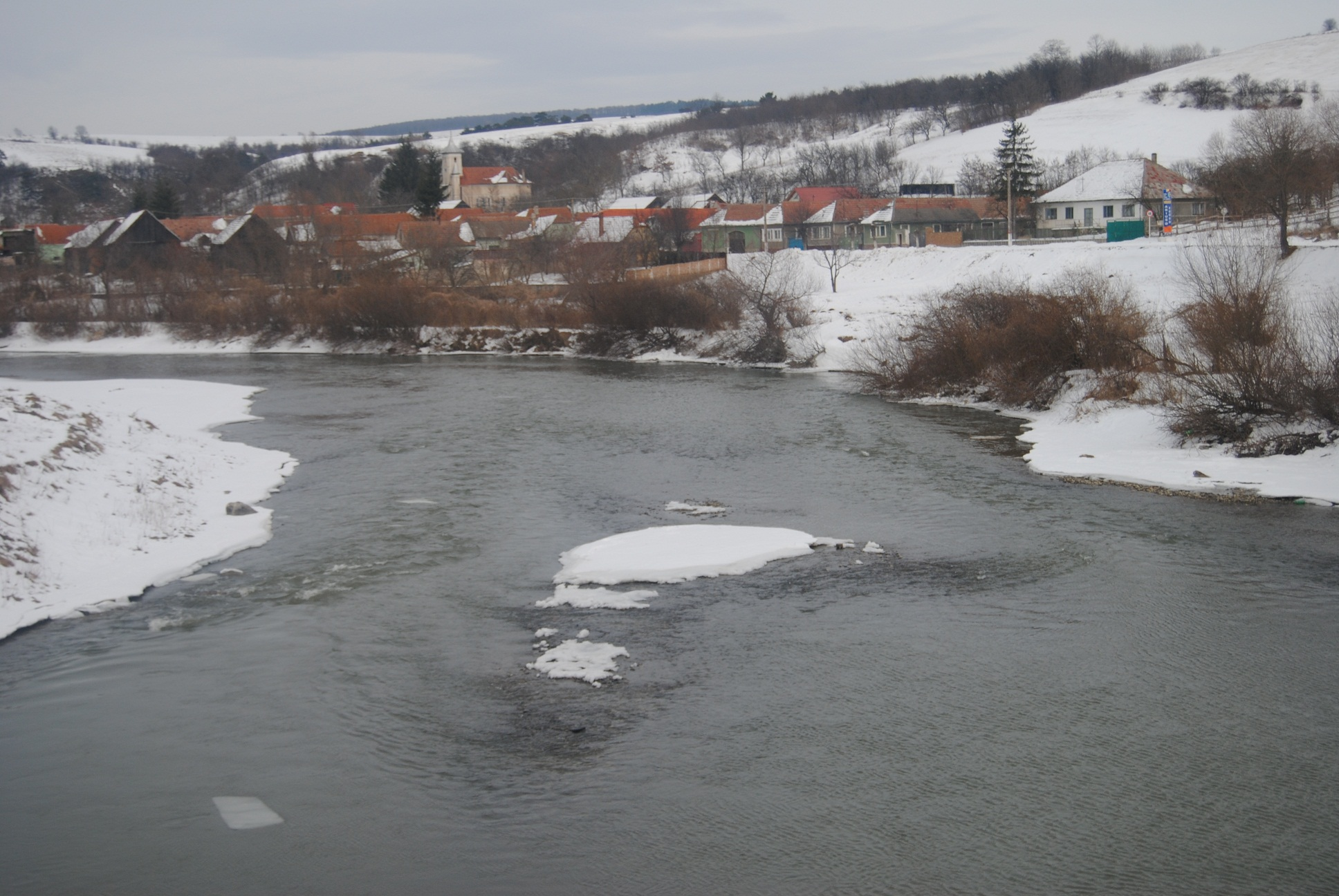
- Olt River near Ariușd

- Location in Covasna County

- Location in Romania
- Coordinates: 45°51′10″N 25°40′53″E
- Country: Romania
- County: Covasna

Government
  - Mayor (2020–2024): László Kovács (UDMR)
- Area: 60.76 km^{2} (23.46 sq mi)
- Elevation: 600 m (2,000 ft)
- Population (2021-12-01): 5,559
  - Density: 91.49/km^{2} (237.0/sq mi)
- Time zone: UTC+02:00 (EET)
  - Summer (DST): UTC+03:00 (EEST)
- Postal code: 527175
- Area code: (+40) 02 67
- Vehicle reg.: CV
- Website: primariavalcele.ro

Vâlcele (Hungarian: Előpatak, Hungarian pronunciation: [ˈɛløːpɒtɒk]) is a commune in Covasna County, Transylvania, Romania composed of four villages: Araci (Árapatak; German: Arendorf; the commune center), Ariușd (Erősd), Hetea (Hetye), and Vâlcele.

== Geography ==
The commune is located in the south-western part of Covasna County, 17 km (11 mi) from the county seat, Sfântu Gheorghe, on the border with Brașov County. It is situated at an altitude of 600 m (2,000 ft), at the foot of the Baraolt Mountains. The Olt River passes through the southern part of the commune.

== Demographics ==
Historical population
Year	Pop.	±%
1850	1,966	—
1920	2,664	+35.5%
1941	3,033	+13.9%
1977	3,050	+0.6%
2002	3,698	+21.2%
2011	4,475	+21.0%
2021	5,559	+24.2%
Source: Census data

Vâlcele has an ethnically mixed population. According to the 2011 census, it had a population of 4,292, of which 48.3% or 2,071 were Roma, 39.4% or 1,689 were Romanians, 9.9% or 427 were Székely Hungarians, and 2.3% or 100 people belonged to other ethnicities. At the 2021 census, the commune had a population of 5,559, of which 58.84% were Roma, 31.59% were Romanians, and 5.05% were Székely Hungarians.

== Natives ==
- Romulus Cioflec (1882 – 1955), writer, journalist, and activist
- Nicolae Colan (1893 – 1967), cleric, a metropolitan bishop of the Romanian Orthodox Church
