= Adrian Albu =

Moldovan politician (born 1983)

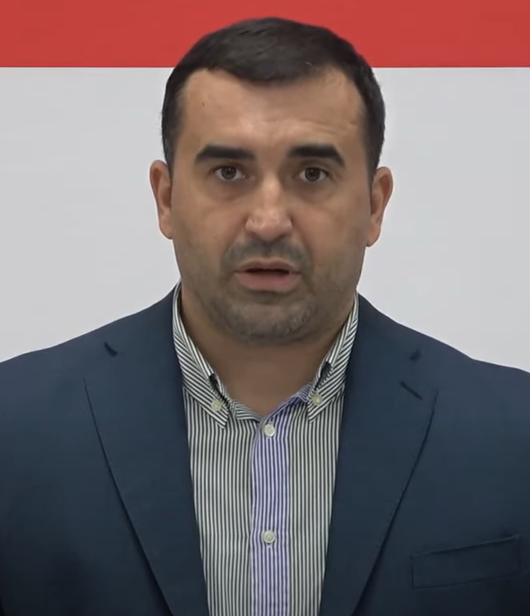
- Albu in 2023

Member of the Moldovan Parliament
- In office 21 July 2022 – 16 October 2025
- Preceded by: Elena Bodnarenco
- Parliamentary group: Bloc of Communists and Socialists

Personal details
- Born: Chișinău, Moldavian SSR, Soviet Union

Adrian Albu (born 29 April 1983) is a Moldovan jurist and politician. He served as a member of the Moldovan Parliament.
