= Camp of Septfonds =

Former internment camp for men during World war II

Camp of Septfonds, also called Camp of Judes, was a labor camp for men before and during World War II, located in southern France near Septfonds, established in 1939, and run by the French Third Republic and the Vichy government.

The Moldovan-French photojournalist Isaac Kitrosser managed to continue as a photographer while interned at Septfonds. His photographs, including "Cérémonie juive dans le camp de Septfonds," were among the first published concentration camp photos after liberation in 1944.

== History ==
=== Establishment and use against Spanish republicans ===
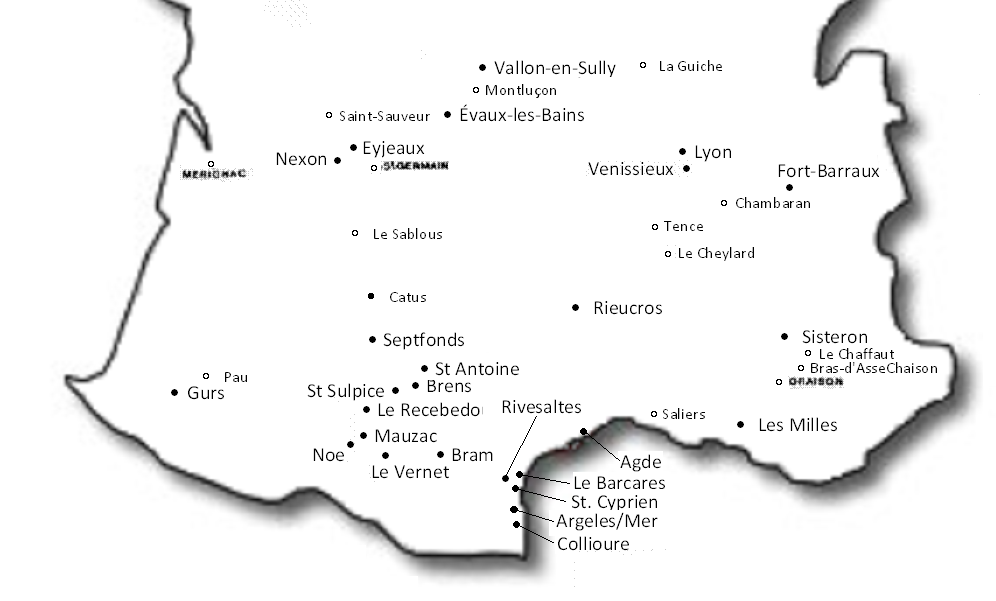
Location of the internment camps in France after the Spanish Civil War in 1939. The map is showing the Camp of Argelès-sur-Mer, Barcarès, Bram, Gurs, Camp d’Agde, Rivesaltes, Vernet, Saint-Cyprien and Septfonds.

After the fall of Barcelona to the Nationalist forces on 26 January 1939, at the end of the Spanish Civil War, a large number of Spanish Republicans, persecuted for political reasons, left Catalonia, crossed the Pyrenees and sought shelter in France. The refugees were treated with hostility by the French government due to their socialist and anarchist political leanings. The decision to open the Septfonds camp was taken by General Ménard on 26 February 1939, and on 5 March the first prisoners of the labor camp arrived. The camp at Septfonds completed the internment system set up by the French authorities for Spanish refugees, consisting mainly of the camps at Argelès-sur-mer, Barcarès and Saint-Cyprien, and the camps at Rieucros, Gurs, Bram and Agde.

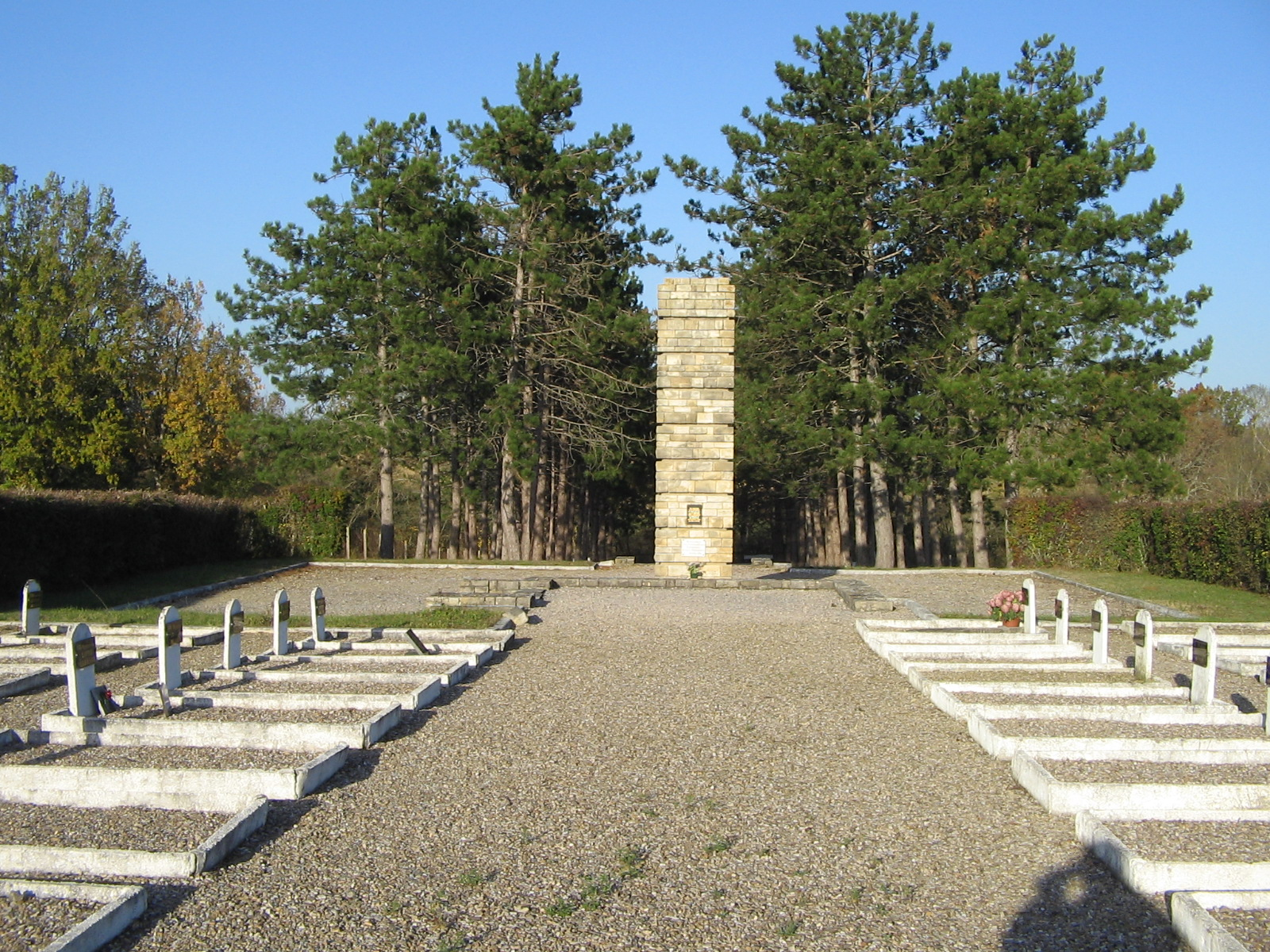
Spanish cemetery at Septfonds

The living conditions were very harsh due to shortage of food supplies and lack of sanitation, hygiene, running water, heating and electricity, resulting in several deaths. However, the interns of the camp organized social, cultural and political activities. A total of 81 Spanish prisoners were buried in the outskirts of the village of Septfonds (44°9′31.37″N 1°37′6.34″E).

=== During World War II ===
On 1 March 1940, the camp started being used for defense purposes, specifically for the training of foreigners who joined the French army.

From autumn of 1940, the Vichy government started using the camp as a prison for undesirables including republican Spaniards, Jews, communists, officers of the Allied army, Poles and people lacking official documentation. The living conditions remained harsh and many people were deported to Auschwitz. The camp's prisoners were liberated in August 1944 by the French Resistance. Until May 1945 the camp was used as a detention center for suspected Nazi collaborators.

== See also ==
- Internment camps in France
