= Vasilcău =

Commune in Soroca District, Moldova

- Commune
- Location within Moldova
- Coordinates: 48.1383333333°N 28.4213888889°E
- Country: Moldova
- District: Soroca District

Population (2014)
  - Total: 2,366
- Time zone: UTC+2 (EET)
  - Summer (DST): UTC+3 (EEST)
- Website: http://www.vasilcau.info.md

Vasilcău is a commune in Soroca District, Moldova. It is composed of three villages: Inundeni, Ruslanovca and Vasilcău.
