= Pârlita =

Pârlita may refer to several entities in Romania:

- Pârlita, a tributary of the Taița in Tulcea County
- Pârlita, the former name of Victoria village, Nufăru Commune, Tulcea County

== See also ==
- Pîrlița (disambiguation)
