= Pîrlița, Soroca =

Pîrlița
- Commune
- Location within Moldova
- Coordinates: 48.0758333333°N 28.21°E
- Country: Moldova
- District: Soroca District

Population (2014)
  - Total: 722
- Time zone: UTC+2 (EET)
  - Summer (DST): UTC+3 (EEST)

Pîrlița is a commune in Soroca District, Moldova. It is composed of three villages: Pîrlița, Vanțina and Vanțina Mică.
