= Cosăuți =

Cosăuți Косеуць
- Commune
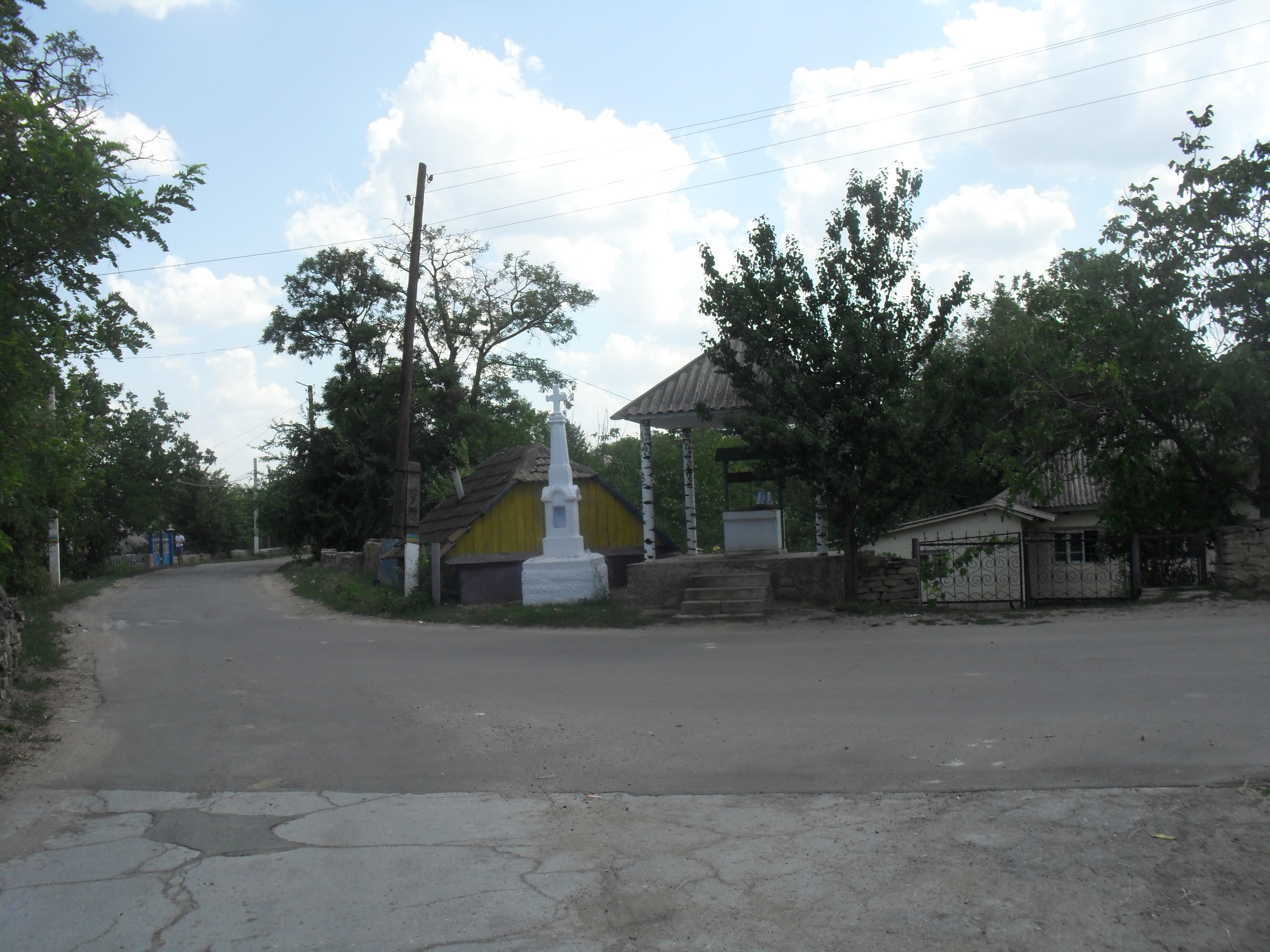

- Location within Moldova
- Coordinates: 48°13′44″N 28°17′28″E
- Country: Moldova
- District: Soroca

Population (2014)
  - Total: 3,254
- Time zone: UTC+2 (EET)
  - Summer (DST): UTC+3 (EEST)

Cosăuți is a commune in Soroca District, Moldova. It is composed of two villages, Cosăuți and Iorjnița. The commune is located on the Moldovan border with Ukraine, near the city of Yampil.

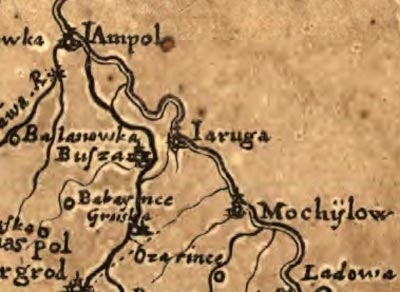
Cosăuți Area on Beauplan's 1648 map.(South is up).

== Notable people ==
- Gheorghe Munteanu (chemist)
