= Soroca Fort =

Historical and architectural monument of national importance in Moldova

- Cetatea Soroca
- Soroca
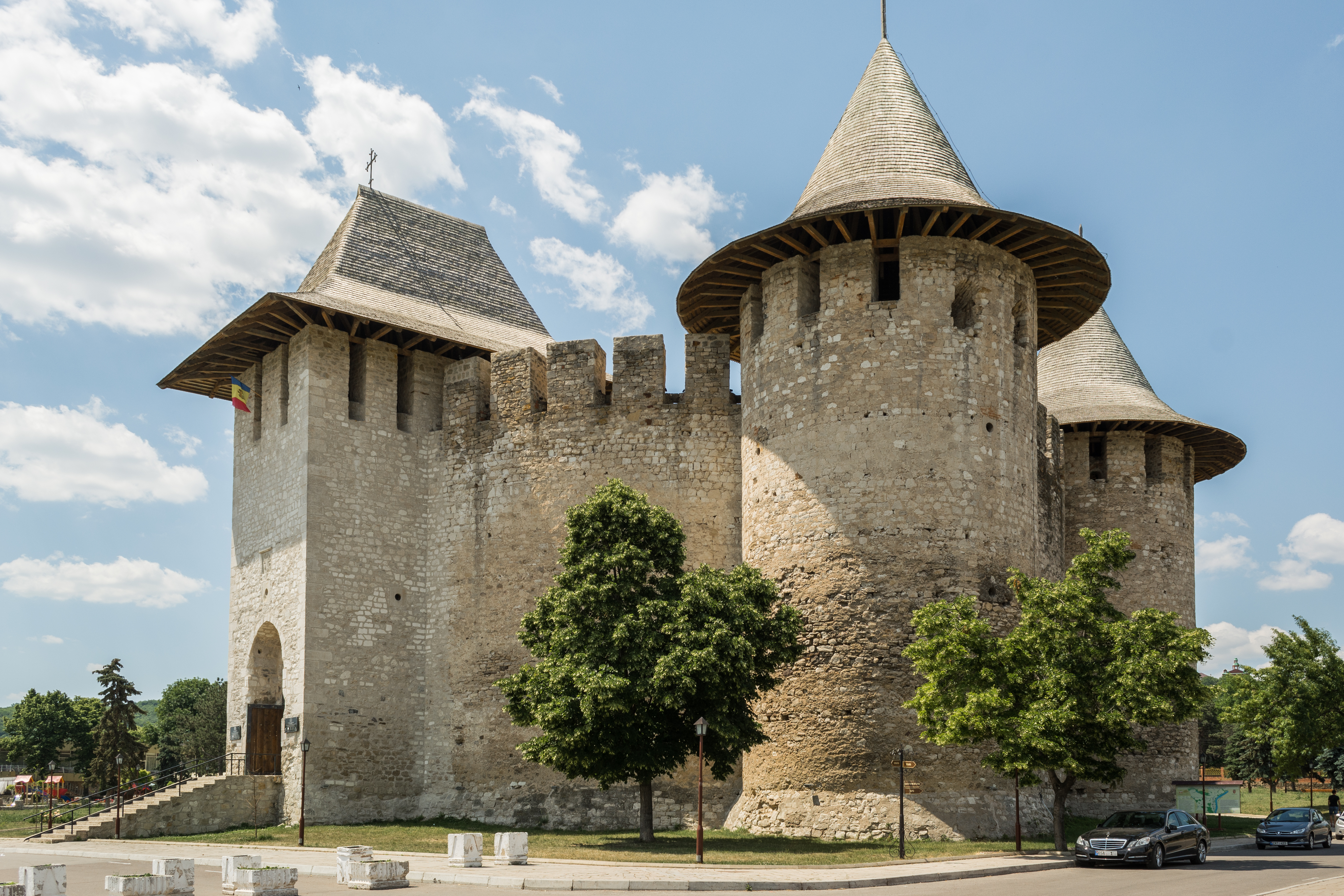
- The fort in 2018

Site information
- Condition: Renovation completed

Location
- Coordinates: 48°9′40.38″N 28°18′19.72″E

Site history
- Built: 1499
- Built by: Stephen the Great, Petru Rareş

Garrison information
- Garrison: From 200 to 250 men

The Soroca Fort (Romanian: Cetatea Soroca) is a historic fort in the Republic of Moldova, in the modern-day city of Soroca.

The city has its origin in the medieval Genoese trade post of Olchionia, or Alchona. It is known for its well-preserved stronghold, established by the Moldavian Prince Stephen the Great (Romanian: Ştefan cel Mare) in 1499.

The original wooden fort, which defended a ford over the Dniester (Romanian: Nistru), was an important link in the chain of fortifications which comprised four forts (also Akkerman, Khotyn, and Tighina) on the Dniester, two forts on the Danube and three forts on the north border of medieval Moldova. Between 1543 and 1546 under the rule of Petru Rareş, the fortress was rebuilt in stone as a perfect circle with five bastions situated at equal distances.

During the Great Turkish War, John Sobieski's forces successfully defended the fortress against the Ottomans. It was of vital military importance during the Pruth Campaign of Peter the Great in 1711. The stronghold was sacked by the Russians in the Russo-Turkish War (1735–1739). The Soroca fortress is an important attraction in Soroca, having preserved cultures and kept the old Soroca in the present day.

== Architecture ==
The current building displays elaborate characteristics of late medieval fortifications:

- The walls are not built straight but in a curved shape to better resist projectiles, as are the four outer towers.
- One can also notice round towers which allowed the defenders to shoot from better angles and thus protect the base of the walls.

These observations suggest that the fort was perhaps built by experts from Western Europe or Transylvanian people who traveled in Western Europe and brought architectural ideas back to Moldova.

The entire building has a diameter of 30 meters, and 4 meters for each tower. Each tower has 4 levels, of which the first two lower ones were used for artillery. The walls are 3 meters thick and we can find signs of a previous ditch. The main entrance tower had 3 doors, amongst them a portcullis which was closed during battles. The space saved at the upper level allowed the garrison to pray in a small chapel.

Despite all these features the fort was obsolete after the end of the 14th century because of the more widespread use of gunpowder.

== See also ==
- Nicolae Bulat
- Khotyn Fortress
- Bilhorod-Dnistrovskyi fortress
- Tighina Fortress
- Medieval Seat Fortress of Suceava
- Neamț Citadel

== Gallery ==
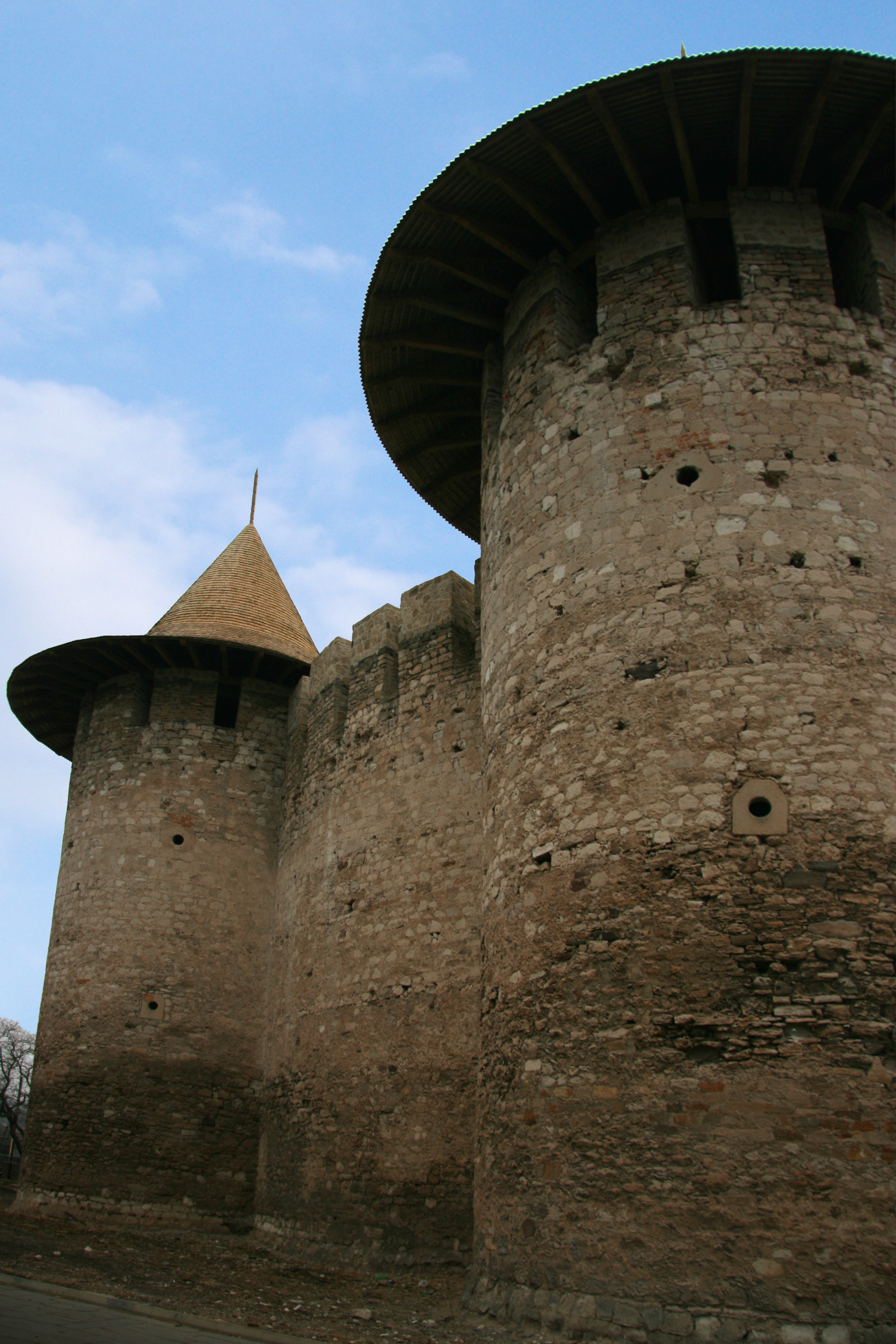

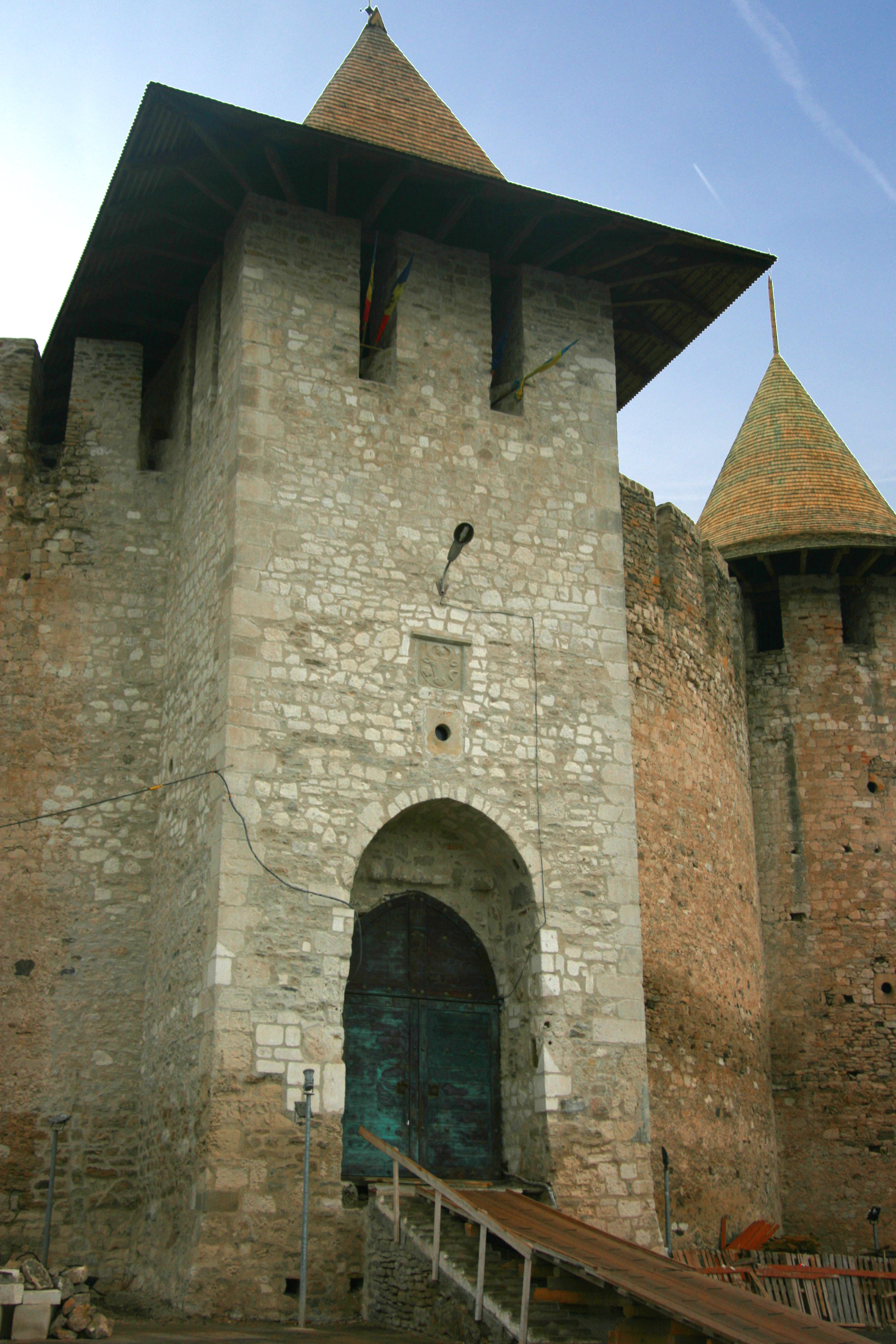

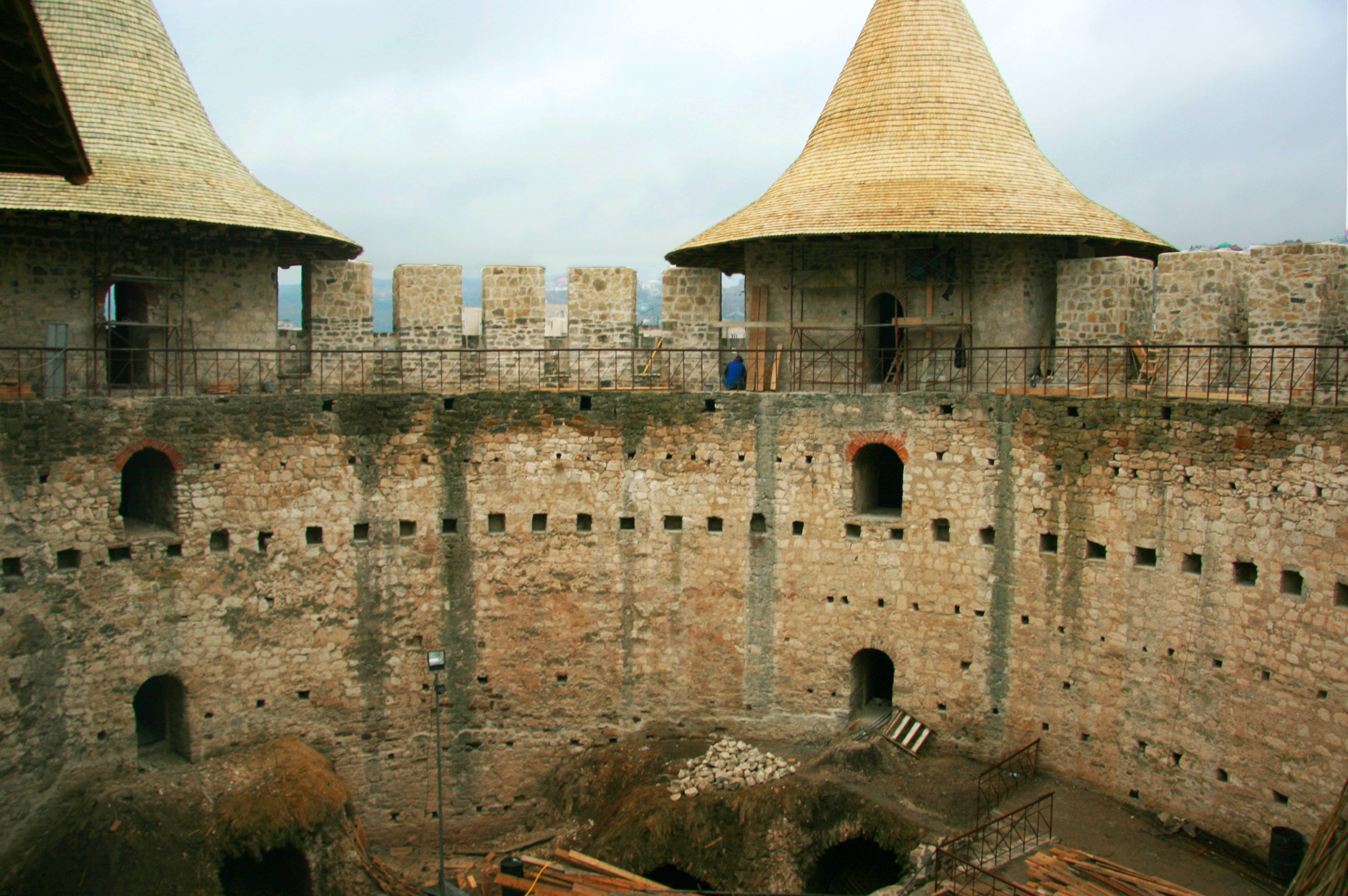

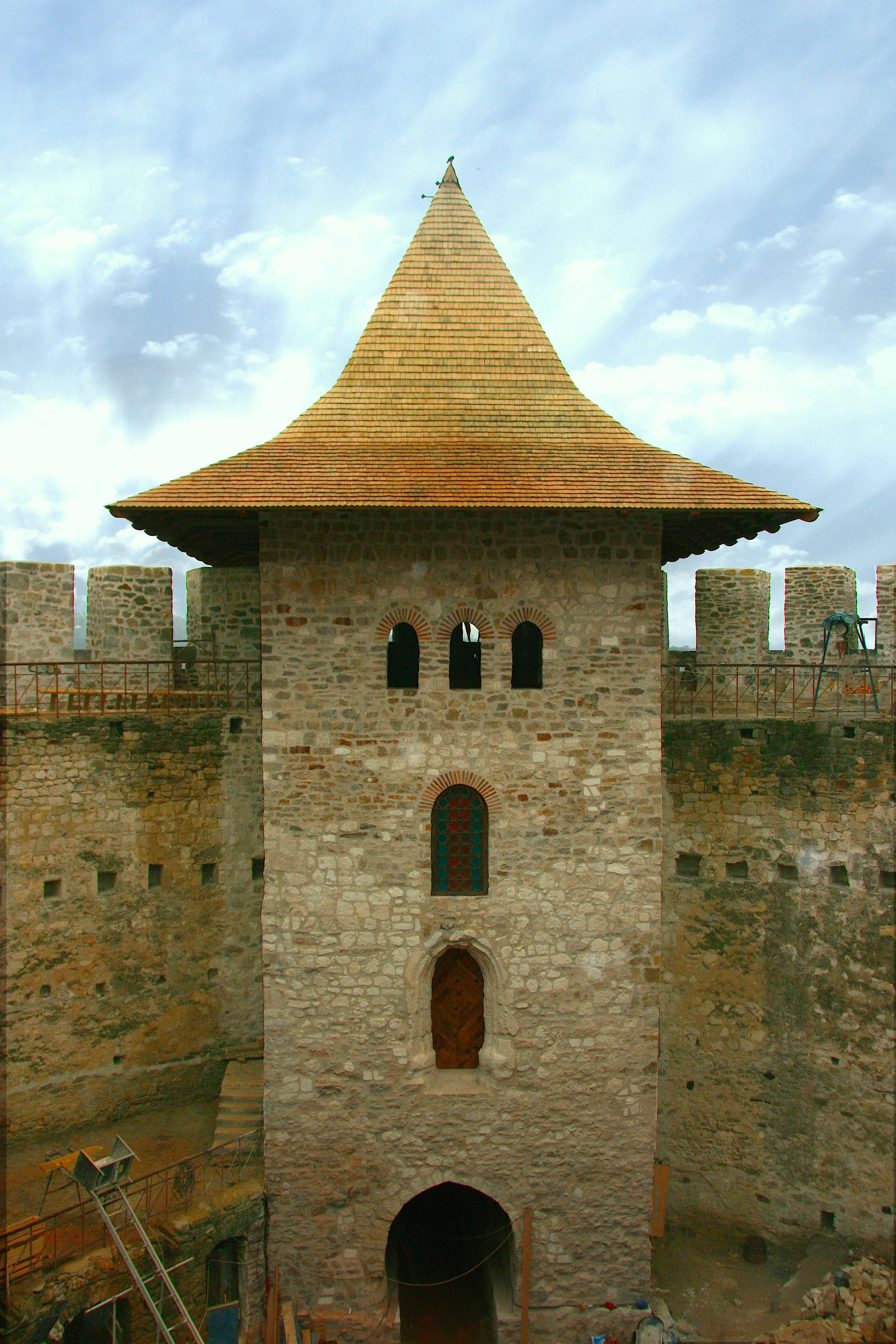

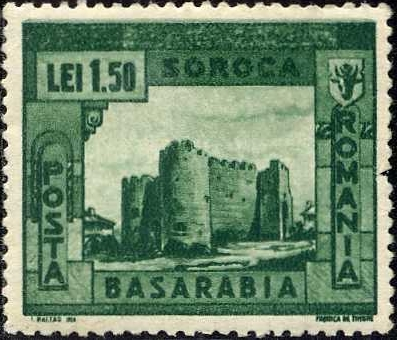
1941 stamp

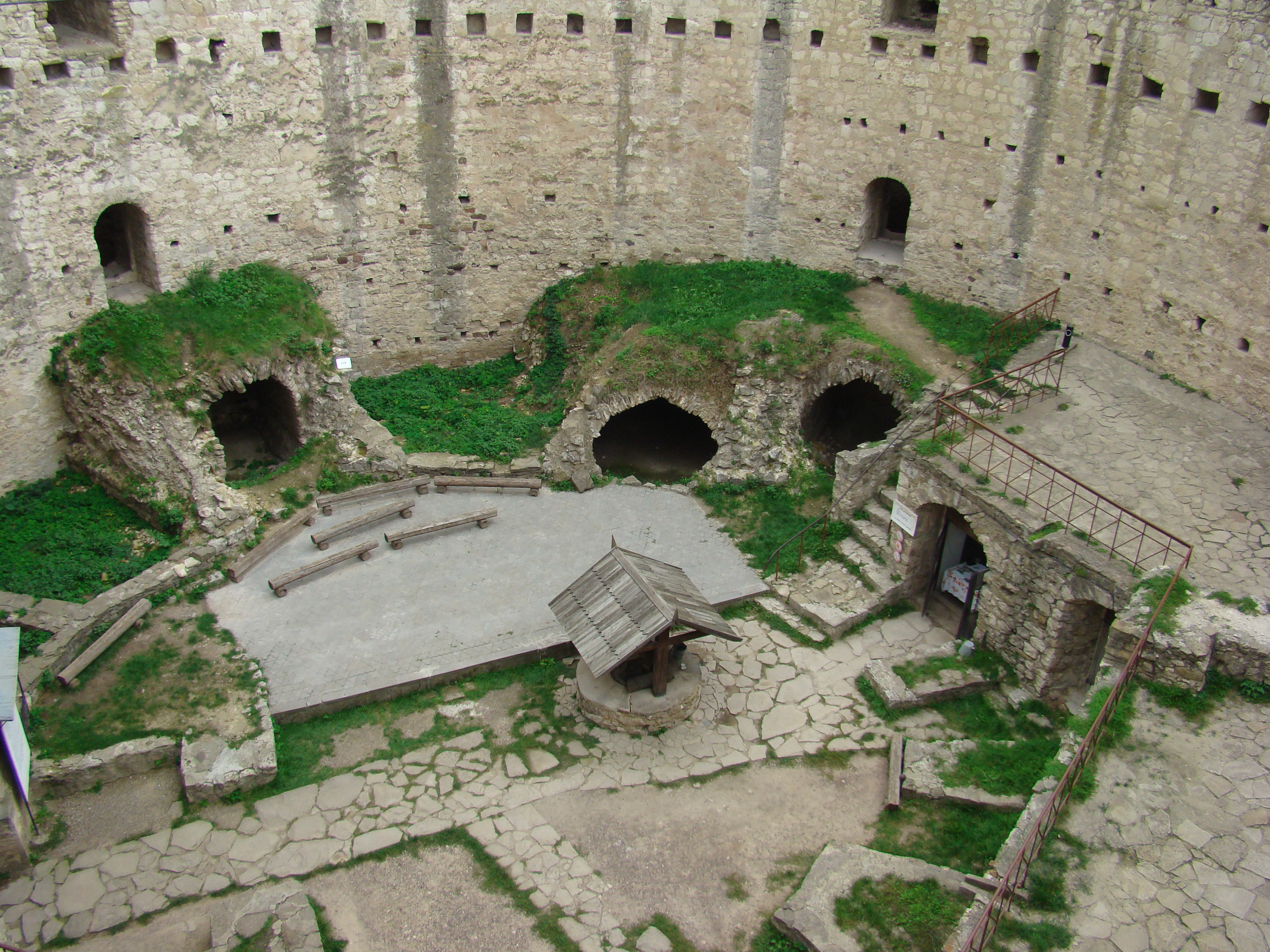

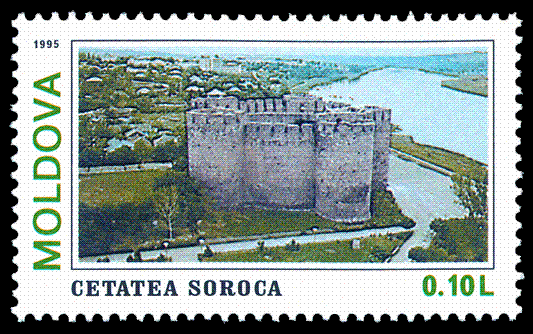
1995 stamp

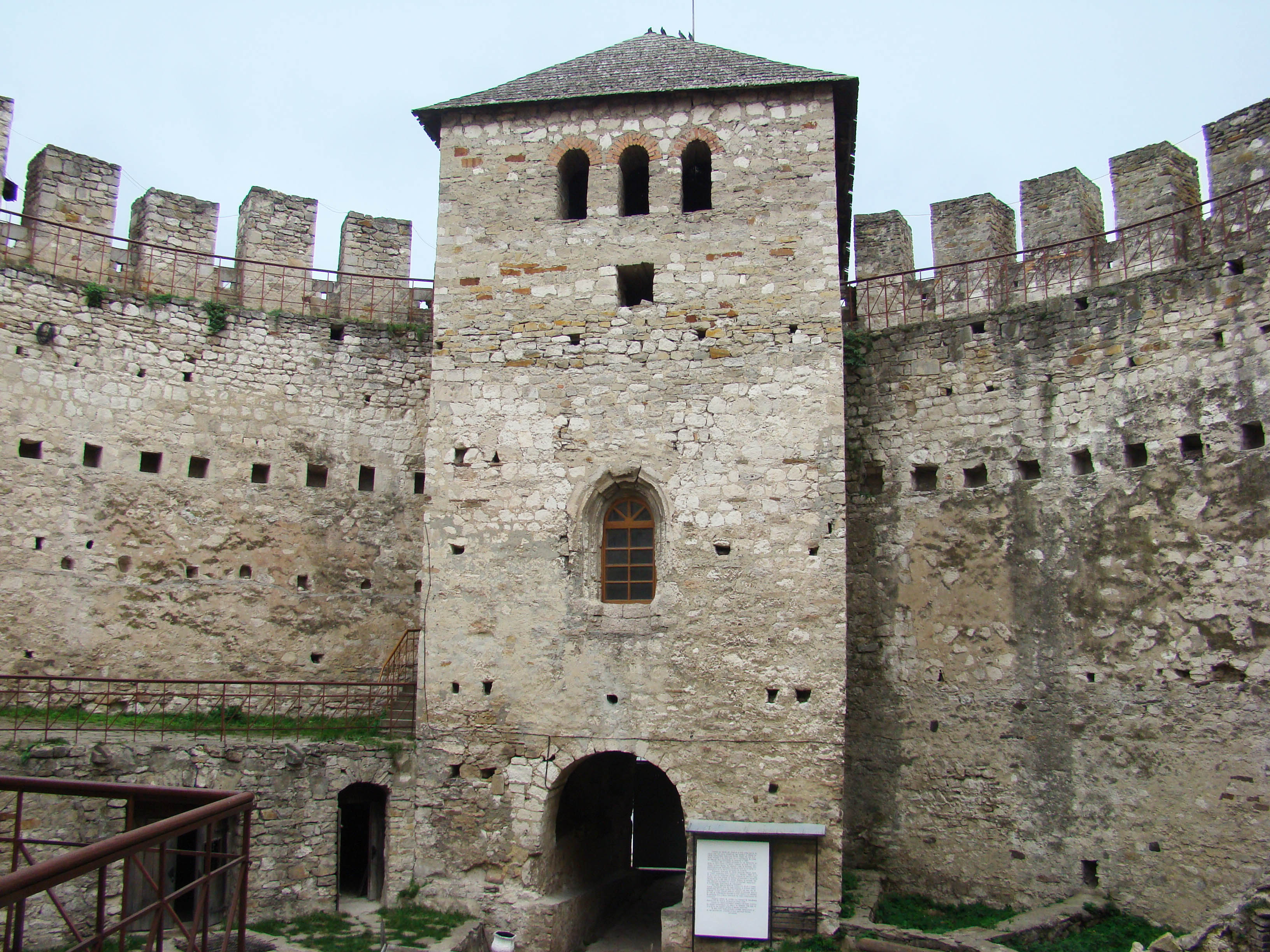

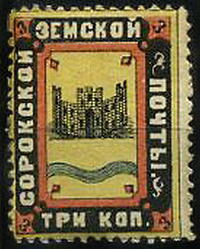
1879 stamp

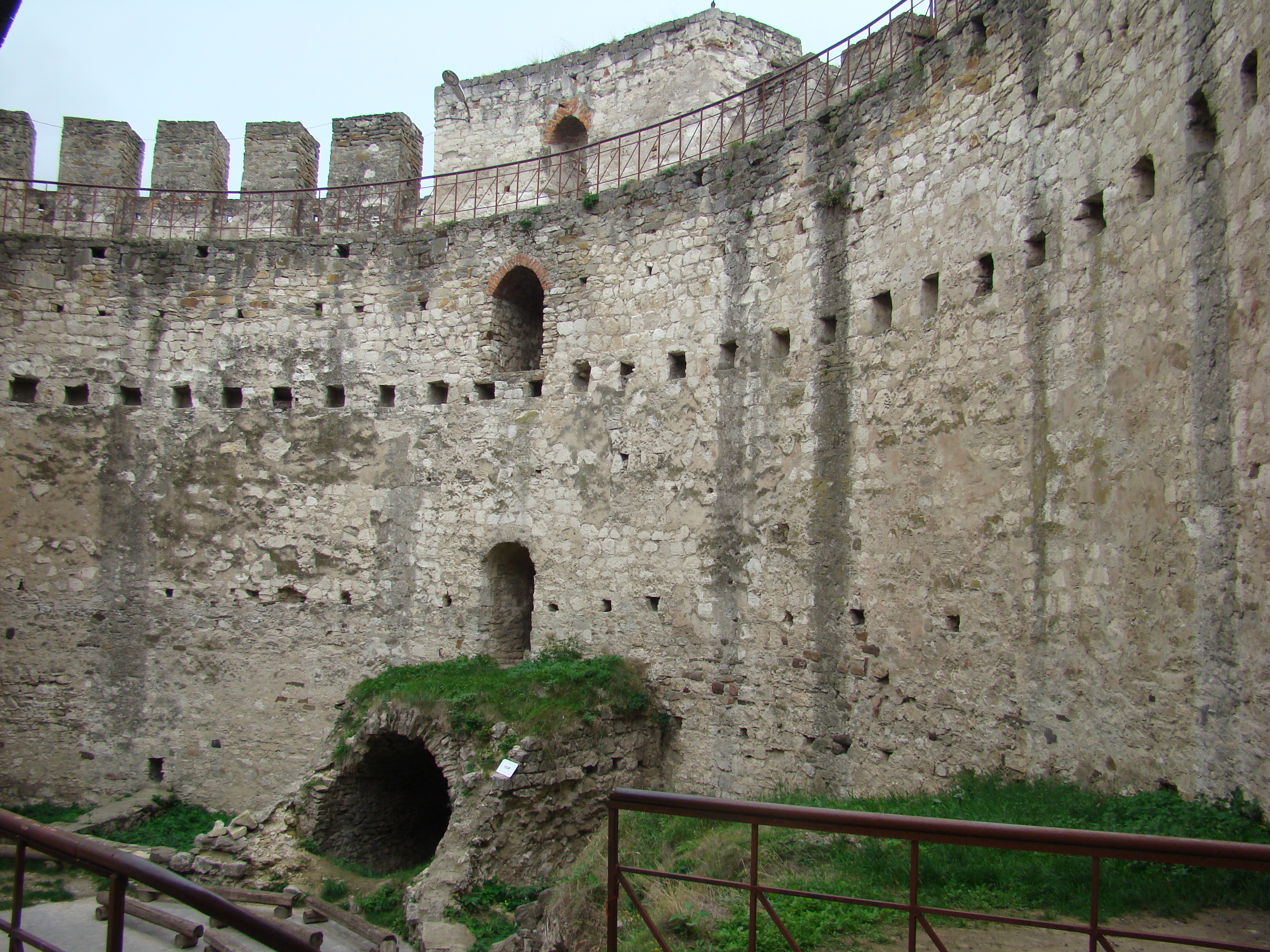
