= Vărăncău, Soroca =

Vărăncău
- Commune
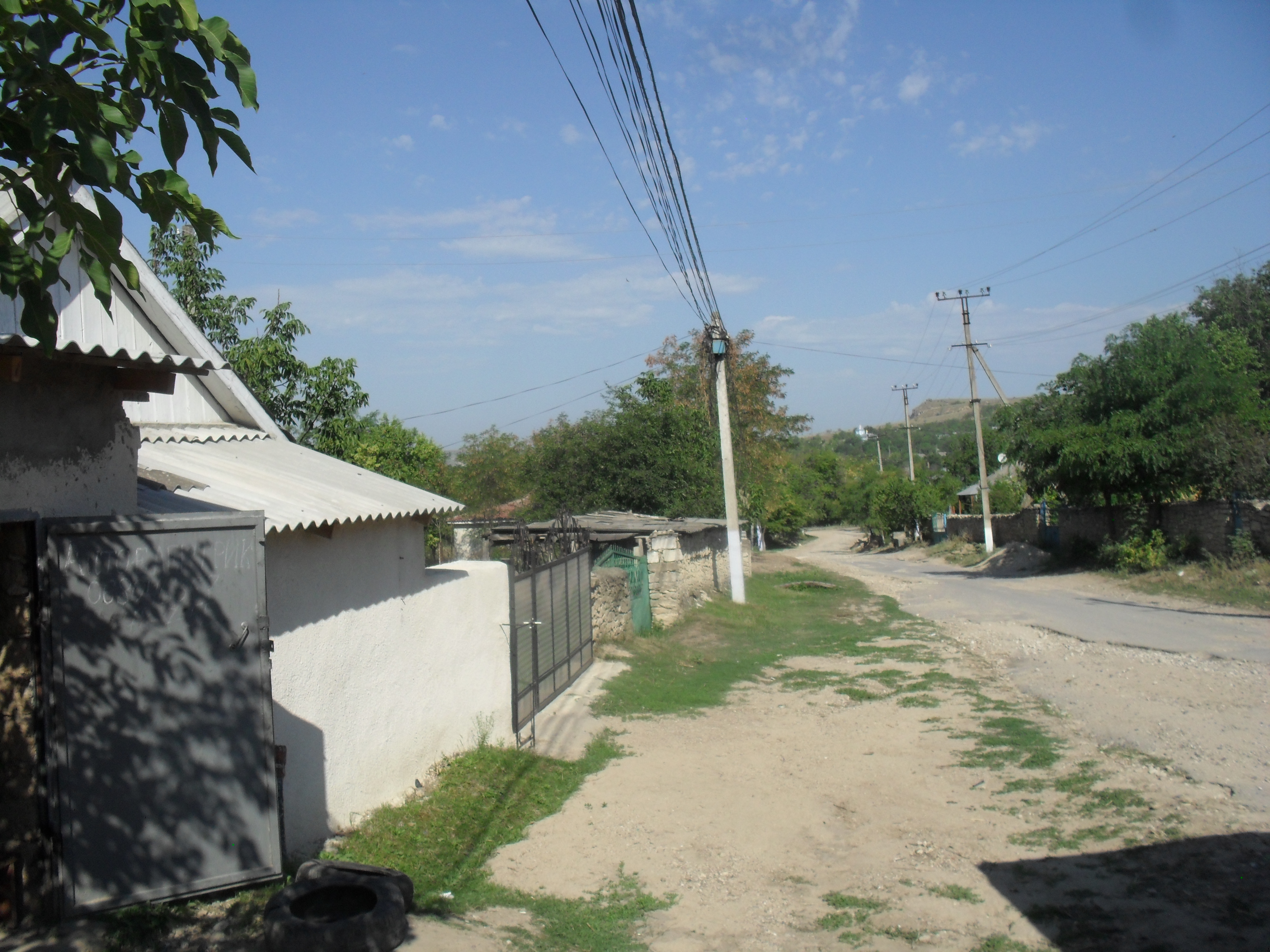
- Interactive map of Vărăncău
- Country: Moldova
- District: Soroca District

Population (2014)
  - Total: 3,120
- Time zone: UTC+2 (EET)
  - Summer (DST): UTC+3 (EEST)
- Postal code: MD-3048

Vărăncău is a commune in Soroca District, Moldova. It is composed of three villages: Slobozia-Cremene, Slobozia-Vărăncău and Vărăncău.
