= Emanuil Gavriliță =

Emanuil G. Gavriliță
- Born: 11 August 1847; Nicoreşti, Soroca
- Died: 10 June 1910 (aged 62); Băxani
- Resting place: Băxani
- Occupation: Lawyer
- Known for: Journalistic activity
- Spouse: Nadejda
- Children: Anatolie, Antonia,

Emanuil G. Gavriliță (11 August 1847 in Nicorești – 10 June 1910 in Băxani) was a lawyer, journalist and activist from Bessarabia. He was the director of Basarabia, a newspaper in Chișinău.

== Honours ==
- Căminul Cultural județean "Emanuil Gavriliță", Soroca

== Bibliography ==
- Poștarencu, Dinu. Emanuil Gavriliță: 90 de ani de la moarte (Contribuții biografice) (Emanuil Gavriliță - 90 ans deppuis sa mort). In: D Rom., 2000, 7, nr. 1, p. 49-54.
- Ştefan Ciobanu, Cultura românească în Basarabia sub stăpânirea rusă, Chişinău, 1923.
- Vocea Basarabiei, (AUDIO) Avocatul Emanuil Gavriliţă - ostaş al cetăţii dreptăţii
- Capitala, Avocatul Emanuil Gavriliță - ostaş al cetăţii dreptăţii
- Colesnic, Iurie, „Emanuil Gavriliță”, în Basarabia necunoscută. Vol. 1, Editura Universitas, Chișinău, 1993, ISBN 5-362-00871-4
