= Victor Său =

Moldovan politician (born 1971)

Mayor of Soroca
- In office 2007–2011
- In office 2015–2019

Personal details
- Born: 18 March 1971 (age 55)
- Party: Liberal Democratic Party of Moldova, National Liberal Party (Moldova)
- Children: 3
- Occupation: Jurist

Victor Său (born 18 March 1971) is a politician from the Republic of Moldova. He served as mayor of Soroca between 2007 and 2011 and for the second time between 2015 and 2019. He is the leader of Liberal Democratic Party of Moldova in Soroca.

He was elected as a mayor of Soroca in 2007 Moldovan local election, when was a leader of the National Liberal Party (Moldova).
