= Soroca District =

Coordinates: 48°10′N 28°15′E

Soroca
- District (Raion)
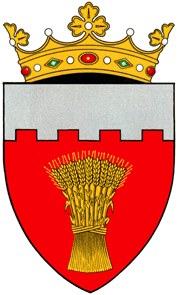
- Flag Coat of arms

- Country: Republic of Moldova
- Administrative center (Oraş-reşedinţă): Soroca
- Established: 2002

Government
  - Raion President: Veaceslav Rusnac

Area
  - Total: 1,040.4 km^{2} (401.7 sq mi)
- Elevation: 347 m (1,138 ft)

Population (2024)
  - Total: 58,609
  - Density: 56.333/km^{2} (145.90/sq mi)
- Time zone: UTC+2 (EET)
  - Summer (DST): UTC+3 (EEST)
- Area code: +373 230
- Car plates: SR
- Website: soroca.org.md

Soroca is a district in north-east Moldova. Its administrative center is the town of Soroca. In the 2024 Moldovan census, the population of the region was 58,609.

== History ==
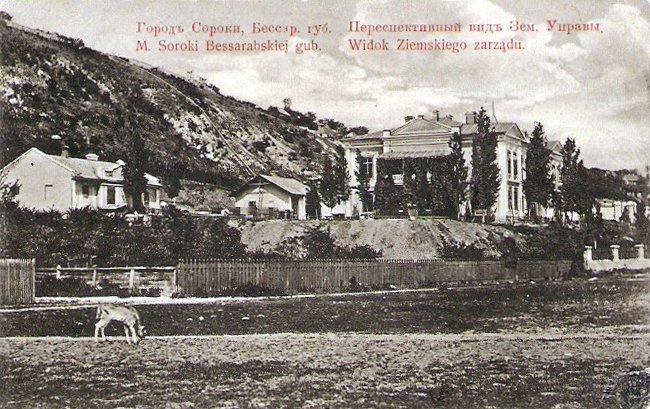
Soroca county Zemstvo, 1911

=== Ancient beginnings ===
Archeological evidence of prehistoric occupation dating to 35,000 to 50,000 years ago has been found in the Soroco region near the village of Rudi. In about 400 to 300 BC, ancient defensive walls were constructed. From the 9th century to the 12th century AD, two towns developed. They were called 'Farfuria Turceasca' and 'Germanariul'. In the 12th and 13th centuries, a Genoese fortress was expanded at Alchiona. In the period 1439–1457, villages are mentioned: Visoca, Vasilcău, Rudi and Pirlita.

=== The new town of Soroca ===
In the second half of the 16th century, Stephan the Great built a wooden fortress on the former Alchiona mount. The fortress was transformed into its present form between 1543 and 1546 during the reign of Peter IV Rareş. The creation of the town allowed for trade along the Nistru while providing protection from foreign invasion. For many years Soroca was a centre for arts and agricultural markets for the Principality of Moldova. At various points in time, Soroca was affected by wars with Tartars, Cossacks, Poles and Russians. Between 1684 and 1699, under control of the Poles, changes in Soroca were made. A deep moat was dug; a well was dug in the courtyard. 14 stone casemates inside. Gradually over time, with more stable rule, the town and its region lost military importance.

=== Soroca in the 19th and 20th centuries ===
In 1812, Soroca was occupied by Russia. The population became more varied as Russians, Ukrainians and Jews moved to the region. From 1849 to 1917 Soroca was governed as part of the Bessarabia region of the Russian Empire. In 1918, at the conclusion of World War I, Bessarabia was made part of Romania. Until 1944, Soroca remained the administrative centre for this Romanian region. In 1944, as World War II reached its end, Soroca became part of the MSSR. Moldova became an independent state in 1991. Since then Soroca has regained the status of an administrative region of Moldova.

== Natural history ==
=== Geography ===
The main geographical feature of Soroca is the Nistru Plateau. The terrain is hilly with deep valleys, dales and ravines. Other features include a gently rolling plain to the north west and the Raut and Nistru rivers. The highest points in Soroca are Vadeni Hill at 347m and the Visoca Hill at 330m.

=== Soil ===
The soil is grey or brown to the height of the Nistru prominence. In other areas, the soils are humic-calcareous, chernozem, alluvial soils or swampy. There are active processes of erosion, karst, torrents of mud and sometimes, landslides in the Soroca district.

=== Climate ===
The climate in Soroca is temperate-continental. Winter is usually mild and short with an average temperature of −5 to −6 °C (23 to 21 °F). Summer is long and warm with an average temperature of 20 to 21 °C (68 to 70 °F). The average annual rainfall is 485 mm. Soroca has a suitable climate for farming cereals, sugar beet, tobacco and also for horticulture.

=== Fauna ===
Fauna in the district is typical of steppe areas. In the Nistru basin there are 68 species of fish. Most of Moldova's 270 bird species are present. There is both natural and introduced wildlife. The introduced species include 19 types of mammal, 37 bird species and 7 types of reptile. Native creatures include foxes, hedgehogs, stone marten, deer, wild boar, raccoon dog and wolf.

=== Flora ===
7 percent of the district is forested. Common trees include oak, hornbeam, maple, linden, ash and elm. Beneath the trees are hawthorn, hazel, cocksfoot, honey bear and others.

=== Natural resources ===
Granite can be found in Cosăuți and building stone at Oclanda, Vărăncău, and Visoca. Cretaceous limestone and iron ores were discovered near the village of Vărăncău. Limestone, for instance in Visoca, is mined for chalk and chalk dust (which is used to make paint). Banks of chalk are also found throughout the Nistru, including in Cremenciug, Soroca, Vasilcău, Vărăncău, and Cerlina. The limestone is extracted in Visoca.

=== Protected areas ===
- Baxani forest
- Cosauti landscape reserve
- Hill "Casca" from Cremenciug
- Nistru threshold from Cosauti
- Reef mounds near Visoca
- Rudi-Arionesti landscape reserve

=== Rivers ===
The Nistru river creates 93 km of the eastern boundary of Soroca. The barrier of the Nistru plateau means the tributaries are short (15 to 25 km). Water from the Nistru river is used for irrigation, public supply and industry. Reservoirs have been constructed to meet public demand. There are also 64 natural reservoirs.

== Administrative subdivisions ==
Soroca has sixty-eight subdivisional areas and thirty-three villages containing thirty-four commons. The administrative centre is the town of Soroca.

== Demographics ==
On the 2024 Census, the district population was 58,609. 36.1% live in urban areas and 63.9% in rural areas.

=== Ethnic groups ===
Ethnic group	% of total
Moldovans *	90.1
Romanians *	4.9
Ukrainians	2.1
Russians	1.1
Romani	1.5
Other	0.2
Undeclared	0.0

Footnote: * There is an ongoing controversy regarding the ethnic identification of Moldovans and Romanians.

=== Religion ===
- Christians - 99.3%
  - Orthodox Christians – 98.1%
  - Protestant – 1.2%
- Other – 0.1%
- No Religion 0.3%
- Not Declared - 0.3%

== Economy ==
Soroca hosts 24645 registered businesses. 62795 hectares (60.2 percent) of the total land area is used for agriculture. Arable land occupies 55 801 ha (53.5 percent) of the total agricultural land area:

- orchards – 6348 (6.0%) ha,
- vineyards – 134 ha, others – 512 ha.
- grassland – 11794 ha (11.3%)
- other – 512 ha.

== Education ==
Soroca has about 58 educational institutions catering for preschool to tertiary students. The total number of students is approximately 12023. Among others, there is a boarding school in Visoca; a special school in Soloneţ; as well as a temporary placement centre for at risk children. In Azimut there is "The Icarus day center for disabled children". In Dacia there is "The house of hope" for youth. Specialised areas of education include sports, teachers' training, agricultural training and a school for the arts. A vocational school has about 308 students.

== Politics ==
Soroca lies in the North Red electoral region. In elections of the first decade of the 21st century, the PCRM achieved 50% of the vote in Soroca. See the table below for the results of the 2010 election. District is one of the founding members of Euroregion Dniester.

Summary of 28 November 2010 Parliament of Moldova election results in Soroca District
Parties and coalitions	Votes	%	+/−
Party of Communists of the Republic of Moldova	20,595	46.29	−2.36
Liberal Democratic Party of Moldova	9,816	22.06	+8.68
Democratic Party of Moldova	6,322	14.21	-1.88
Liberal Party	2,565	5.76	−2.20
Party Alliance Our Moldova	2,097	4.71	−5.86
European Action Movement	937	2.11	+2.11
Other Party	2,180	4.86	+1.51
Total (turnout 60.25%)	44,867	100.00	

== Culture ==
The Soroca region hosts a number of cultural centres and libraries. There are also museums, art galleries and monuments. The region preserves objects of national importance and local importance. There are two monasteries: The Monastery of the Assumption in Cosuti and the Monastery of Rudi.

== Health ==
Soroca has a general hospital with about 375 beds. It is complemented by general practitioners, health centres and specialists.

== Personalities ==
- Emanuil Gavriliță – lawyer, journalist and activist
- Eugen Coca – composer and violinist
- Kira Muratova – director, screenwriter
- Leonte Tismăneanu – Communist militant
- Luda Kroitor – Australian dancer, five-time world champion salsa, winner of the Australian show "Dancing with the Stars" (2008)
- Robert Steinberg – Canadian and American mathematician, known for his work on representation theory
- Samuel Bronfman – Canadian businessman, billionaire, philanthropist and founder of the distillery company "Seagram"
- Margareta Timofti – First Lady of Moldova (2012-2016)

== See also ==
- Soroca County (Moldova)
