= Soroca =

City in Soroca District, Moldova

- Municipality
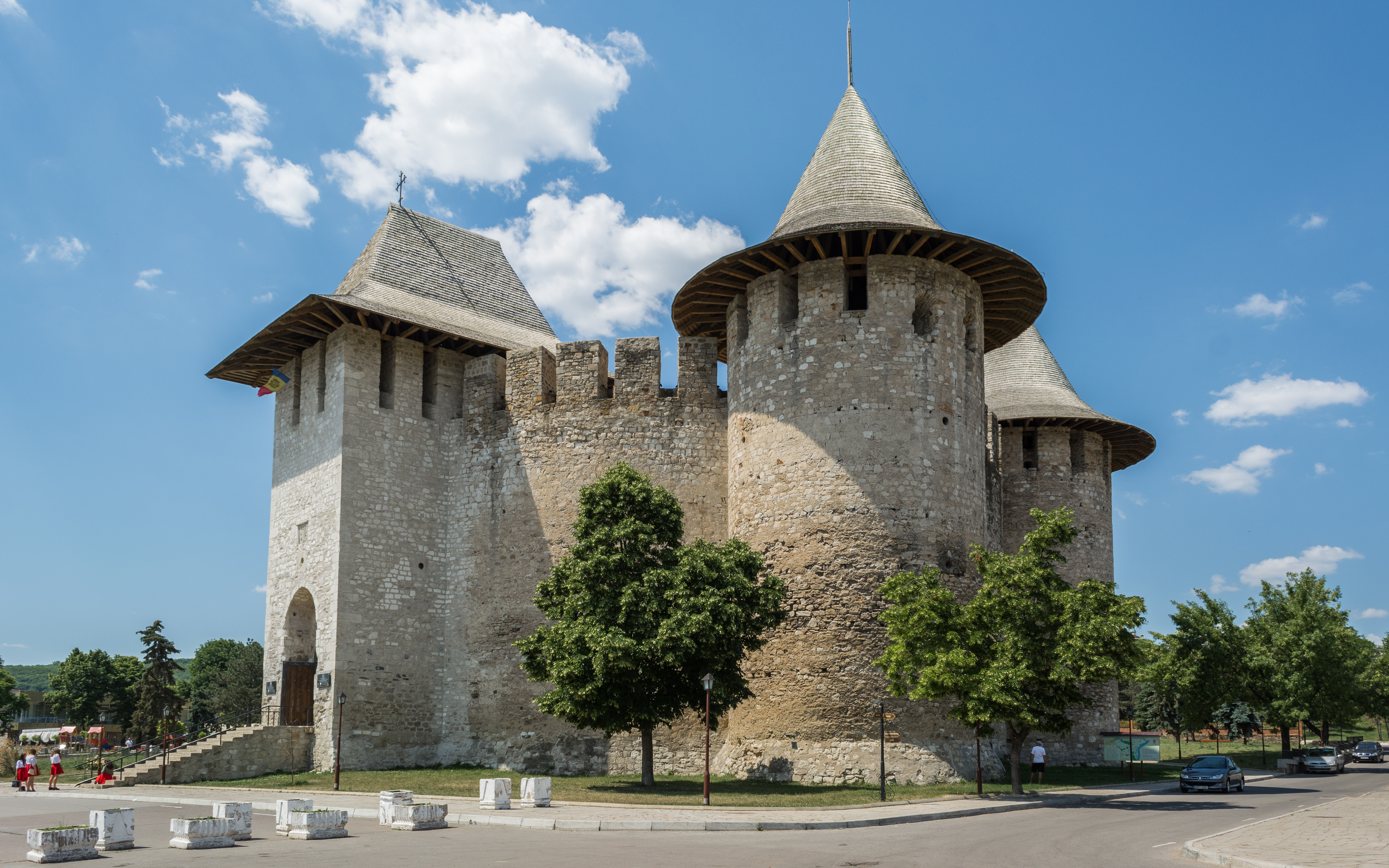
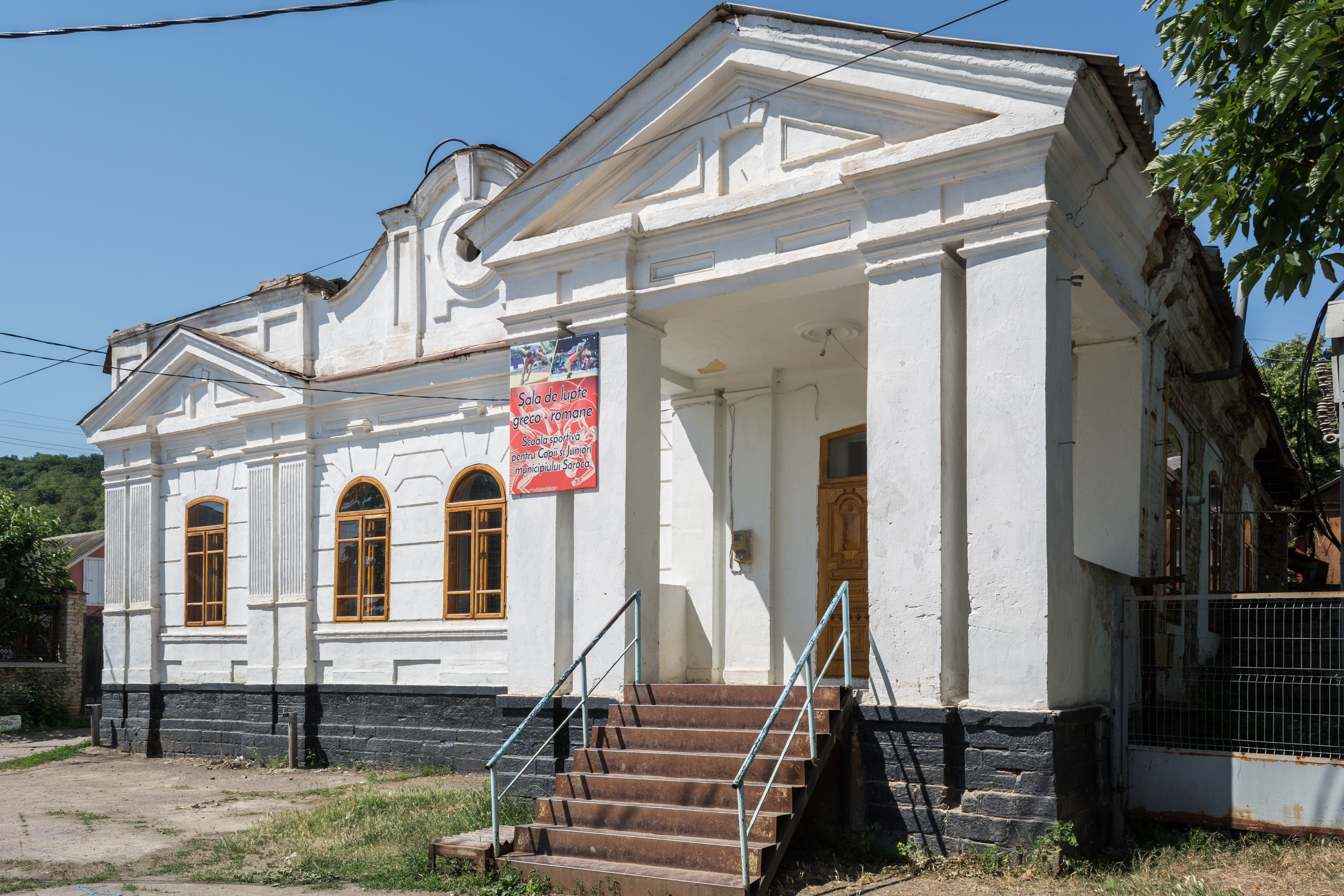
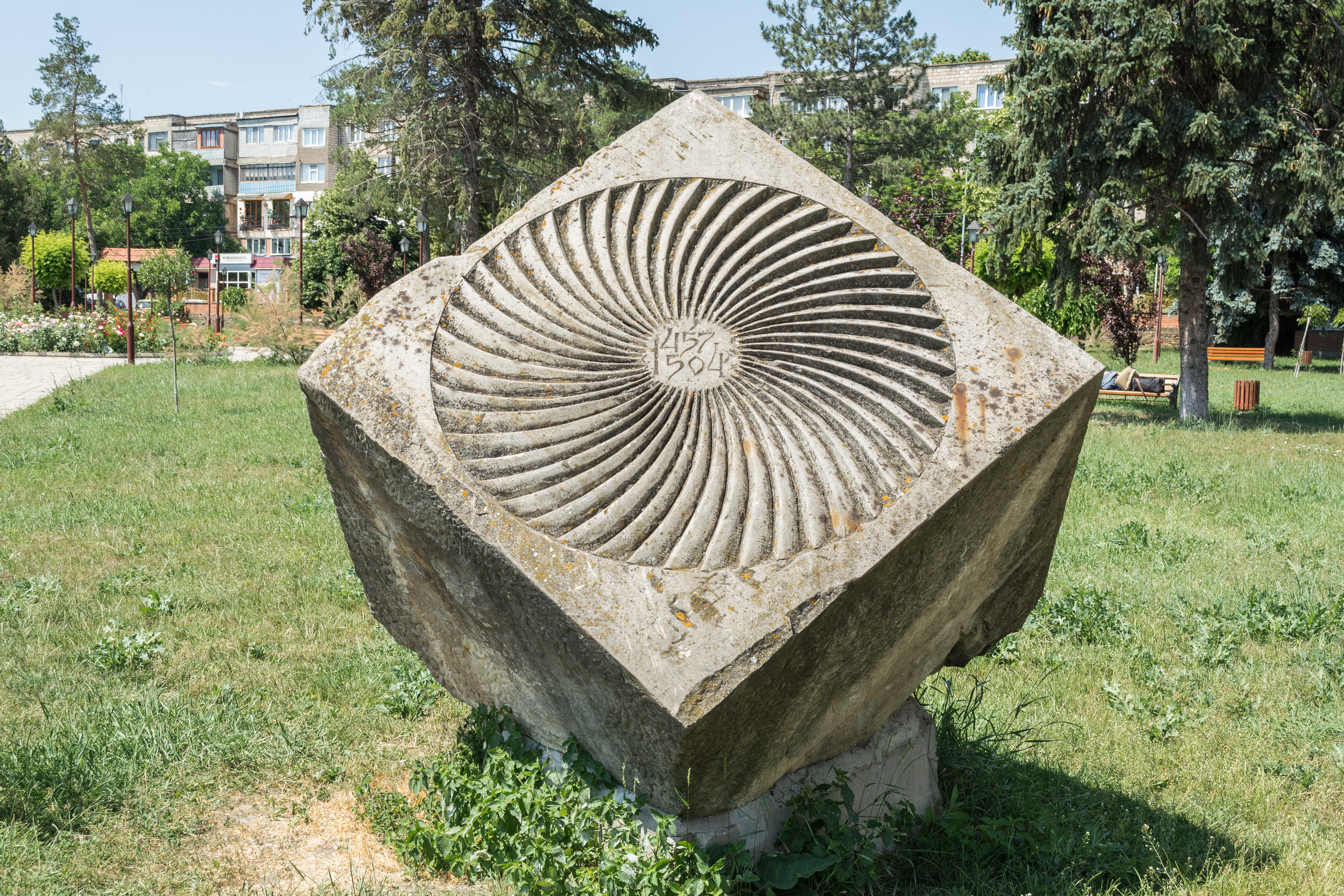
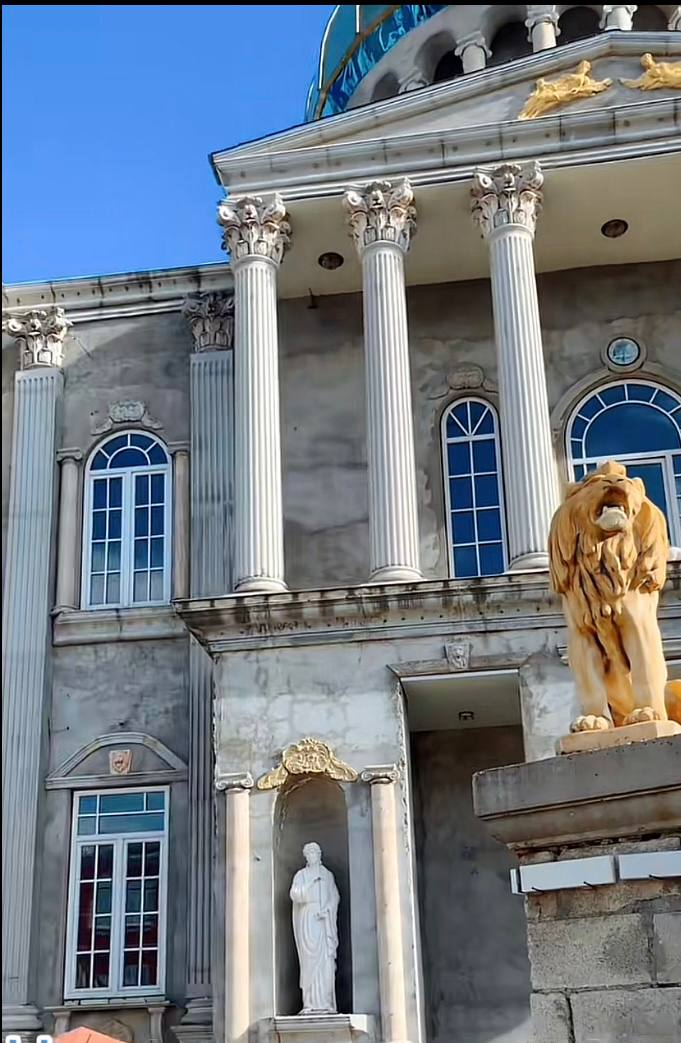
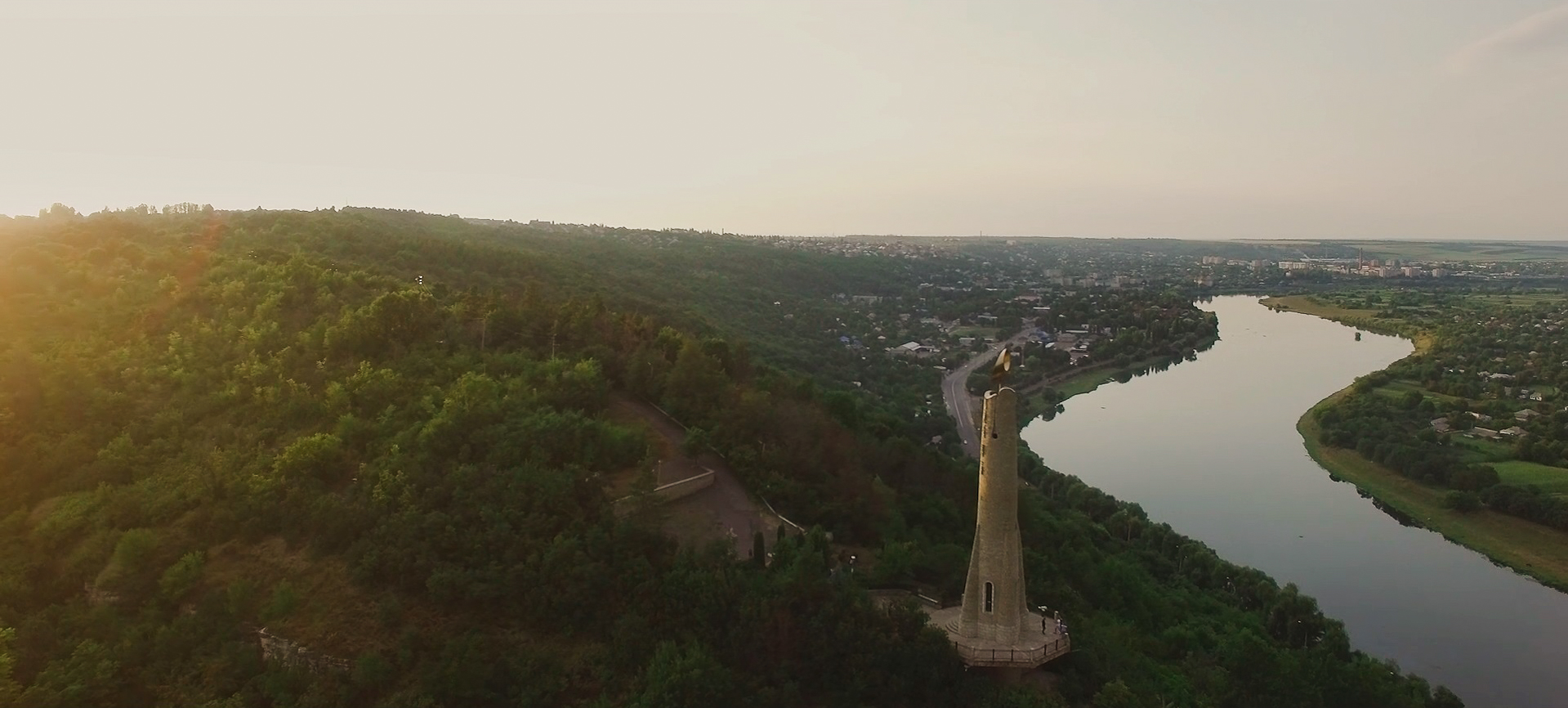
- Soroca Fort and Soroca

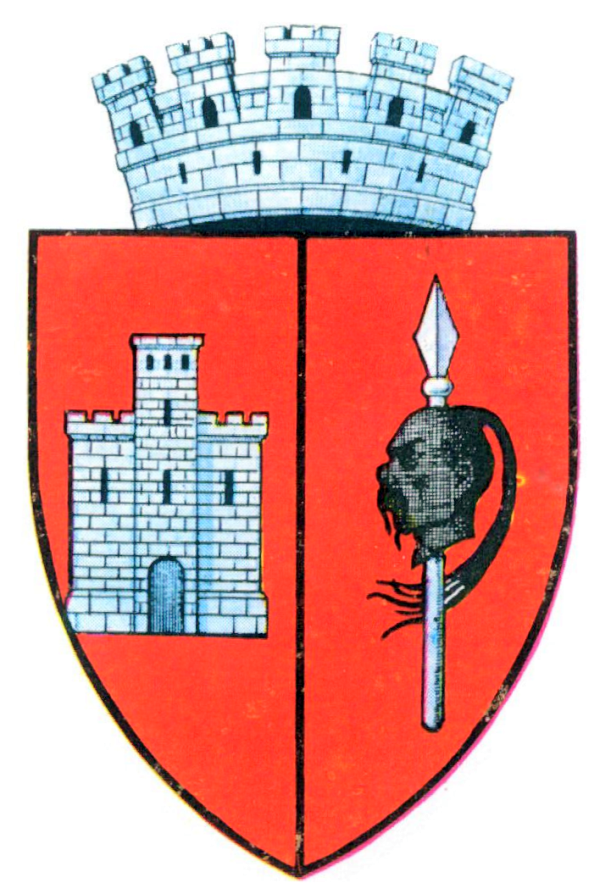
- Coat of arms

- Location within Moldova
- Coordinates: 48°10′N 28°18′E
- Country: Moldova
- County: Soroca
- Established: 1499

Government
  - Mayor: Lilia Pilipețchi (PSRM)

Area
  - Total: 11.88 km^{2} (4.59 sq mi)
- Elevation: 45 m (148 ft)

Population (2024)
  - Total: 21,135
  - Density: 1,779/km^{2} (4,608/sq mi)
- Time zone: UTC+2 (EET)
  - Summer (DST): UTC+3 (EEST)
- Postal code: MD-3001
- Area code: +373 230
- Website: Official website

Soroca is a city and municipality in northern Moldova, situated on the Dniester River about 160 km (99 mi) north of Chișinău. It is the administrative center of the Soroca District.

== History ==
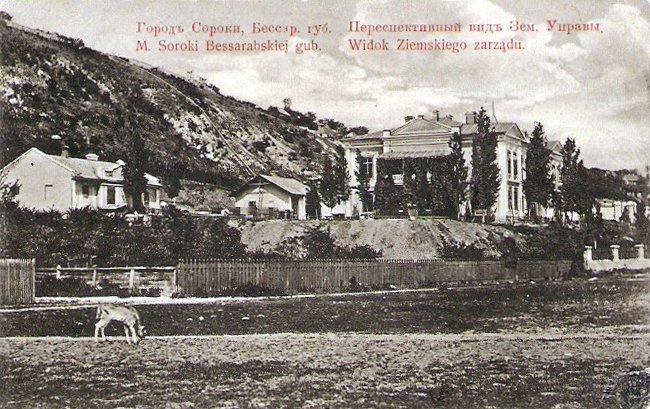
Zemstva of Soroca, 18th-19th century

It is known for its well-preserved stronghold, established by the Moldavian prince Stephen the Great (Ștefan cel Mare in Romanian) in 1499. The origins of the name Soroca are not fully known. Soroca (сорока) is the East Slavic word for magpie. Its location is only a few kilometers from the Moldova–Ukraine border.

The original wooden fort, which defended a ford over the Dniester, was an important link in the chain of fortifications which comprised four forts (e.g., Bilhorod-Dnistrovskyi, then known as Akkerman, and Khotyn) on the Dniester, two forts on the Danube, and three forts on the north borders of medieval Moldavia. Between 1543 and 1546, under the rule of Peter IV Rareș, the fort was rebuilt in stone as a perfect circle with five bastions situated at equal distances.

During the Great Turkish War, John III Sobieski's forces successfully defended the fort against the Ottomans. It was of vital military importance during the Pruth River Campaign of Peter the Great in 1711. The stronghold was sacked by the Russians in the Austro-Russian–Turkish War (1735–39). The Soroca Fort is an important attraction in Soroca, having preserved cultures and kept the old Soroca to the present day.

The locality was greatly extended in the 19th century, during a period of relative prosperity. Soroca became a regional center featuring large squares, modernized streets, hospitals, grammar schools and conventionalized churches. During the Soviet period, the city became an important industrial center for northern Moldova.,"

Soroca was known for producing grapes, wheat, maize, and tobacco in 1919.

In the past, Socora was notable for its sizeable Jewish population. First mentioned in 1653, the town had one of the oldest Jewish populations in Eastern Europe. As of 1930, 5,462 Jews lived in Socora, which constituted 36% of the population. During the Holocaust, many of the Jews living in Socora were either killed or deported to Transnistria. Following the war, there were an estimated 1,000 Jews in the village. As of 2004, only about 200 Jews lived in Socora.

== Climate ==
The climate in Soroca is a warm-summer subtype (Köppen: Dfb) of the humid continental climate.

Climate data for Soroca (1991–2020, extremes 1946–2026)
Month	Jan	Feb	Mar	Apr	May	Jun	Jul	Aug	Sep	Oct	Nov	Dec	Year
Record high °C (°F)	13.9 (57.0)	19.9 (67.8)	26.4 (79.5)	31.0 (87.8)	34.3 (93.7)	37.2 (99.0)	39.5 (103.1)	39.7 (103.5)	37.4 (99.3)	30.1 (86.2)	23.2 (73.8)	17.5 (63.5)	39.7 (103.5)
Mean daily maximum °C (°F)	0.0 (32.0)	2.1 (35.8)	8.3 (46.9)	16.3 (61.3)	22.0 (71.6)	25.6 (78.1)	27.5 (81.5)	27.4 (81.3)	21.5 (70.7)	14.5 (58.1)	7.0 (44.6)	1.4 (34.5)	14.5 (58.1)
Daily mean °C (°F)	−2.9 (26.8)	−1.4 (29.5)	3.5 (38.3)	10.4 (50.7)	16.0 (60.8)	19.6 (67.3)	21.3 (70.3)	20.8 (69.4)	15.6 (60.1)	9.5 (49.1)	3.8 (38.8)	−1.3 (29.7)	9.6 (49.3)
Mean daily minimum °C (°F)	−5.3 (22.5)	−4.3 (24.3)	−0.5 (31.1)	5.0 (41.0)	10.2 (50.4)	14.0 (57.2)	15.5 (59.9)	14.7 (58.5)	10.2 (50.4)	5.3 (41.5)	1.1 (34.0)	−3.7 (25.3)	5.2 (41.4)
Record low °C (°F)	−34.9 (−30.8)	−29.9 (−21.8)	−22.4 (−8.3)	−14.2 (6.4)	−2.5 (27.5)	3.4 (38.1)	6.2 (43.2)	3.3 (37.9)	−6.3 (20.7)	−12.7 (9.1)	−21.4 (−6.5)	−30.0 (−22.0)	−34.9 (−30.8)
Average precipitation mm (inches)	30 (1.2)	28 (1.1)	31 (1.2)	39 (1.5)	56 (2.2)	67 (2.6)	80 (3.1)	50 (2.0)	54 (2.1)	38 (1.5)	40 (1.6)	28 (1.1)	542 (21.3)
Average precipitation days (≥ 1.0 mm)	6	6	6	7	8	7	8	6	6	5	6	6	76
Average relative humidity (%)	84	82	77	66	64	67	68	67	70	76	84	86	74
Source 1: NOAA
Source 2: Serviciul Hidrometeorologic de Stat (extremes, relative humidity)

== Demographics ==
According to the 2024 census, 21,135 inhabitants lived in Soroca (making it the tenth largest city in Moldova), a decrease compared to the previous census in 2014, when 22,196 inhabitants were registered.

Ethnic composition of Soroca (2024)
1. Moldovans (Note: There is an ongoing controversy regarding the ethnic identification of Moldovans and Romanians.) (82.5%)
2. Romanians (6.60%)
3. Romani (4.00%)
4. Ukrainians (3.80%)
5. Russians (2.60%)
6. Others (0.40%)
Linguistic composition of Soroca (2024)
1. Moldovan (Note: In March 2023, the Parliament of Moldova passed a law updating all legislative texts and the constitution to refer to the national language as Romanian, effectively rendering the term "Moldovan" obsolete.) (57.5%)
2. Romanian (27.1%)
3. Russian (8.90%)
4. Romani (4.20%)
5. Ukrainian (2.00%)
6. Other (0.20%)

Historical population
Year	Pop.	±%
1867	7,758	—
1882	9,225	+18.9%
1897	15,351	+66.4%
1930	15,001	−2.3%
1959	15,195	+1.3%
1970	21,924	+44.3%
1979	30,365	+38.5%
1989	42,297	+39.3%
2004	28,362	−32.9%
2014	22,196	−21.7%
2024	21,135	−4.8%

The population was estimated at 35,000 in 1919. It consisted mainly of Jews. Romanians, Germans, and Russians also lived in the city. Before the Holocaust, Soroca had a Jewish population of around 18,000, but there are only around 40 Jews living there today.

The city has a sizable Romani minority and is popularly known as the "Romani capital of Moldova".

== Mayor ==
The Mayor of Soroca is head of the executive branch of Soroca City Council.

List of mayors of Soroca
Name	From	Until	Party	Pool
Mihail Popovschi	2003	2007	PCRM	2003
Victor Său	2007	2011	PNL	2007
Elena Bodnarenco	2011	2015	PCRM	2011
Victor Său	2015	2019	PLDM	2015
Lilia Pilipețchi	2019	Present	PSRM	2019

== Media ==
- Observatorul de Nord, a newspaper from Soroca, founded in 1998
- Vocea Basarabiei, 67,69 and 103.1

== Natives ==
- Samuel Bronfman (1889–1971), a Jewish-Canadian entrepreneur, former owner of Seagram
- Alexandru Cimbriciuc
- Arkady Gendler (1921–2017), Jewish-Ukrainian Yiddish Singer
- Sofia Imber, a Venezuelan journalist, founder of the Contemporary Art Museum of Caracas
- Isaac Kitrosser, French Jewish photojournalist
- James J. Matles, United States labor union leader
- Anna Mincovschi, mother of Robert Hossein
- Kira Muratova, a Soviet and Ukrainian film director, screenwriter and actress
- David Seltzer (1904–1994), New York Yiddish language Jewish writer, journalist and poet
- Marina Shafir, a Moldovan mixed martial arts and professional wrestler currently works for All Elite Wrestling.
- Nicolae Șoltuz, a member of Sfatul Țării
- Robert Steinberg, a Jewish-Canadian mathematician
- Leonte Tismăneanu, a Romanian communist activist
- Eugen Ţapu (1983–2009), a protester in the post-election riots in Chișinău who died while in police custody
- Gheorghe Ursu (1926–1985), a Romanian construction engineer and dissident
- Mark Tkaciuk, historian, politician
- The family of Karl Maramorosch

== Gallery ==
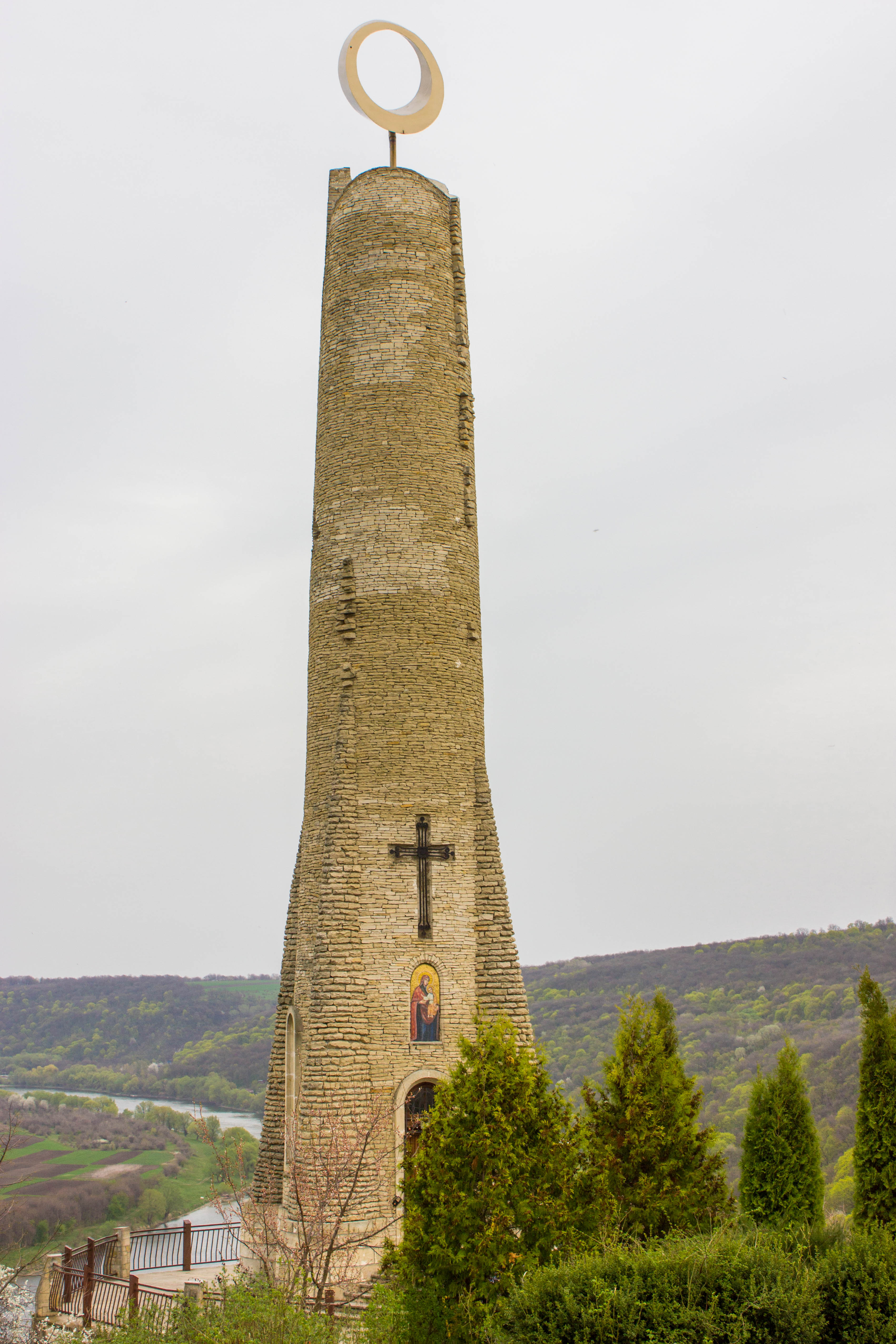
Candle of Gratitude can be seen at night from Otaci and Camenca.

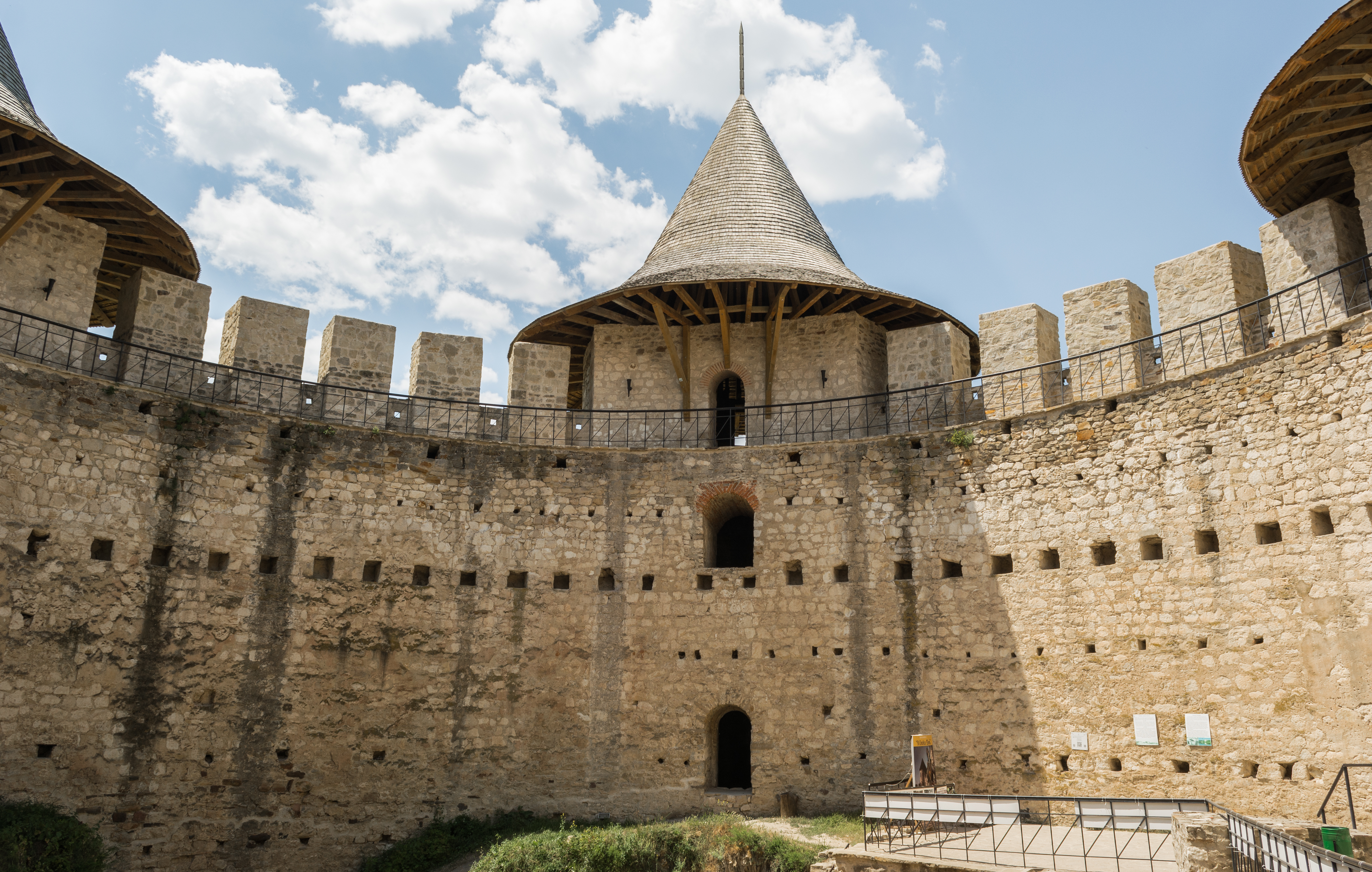
Soroca Fort

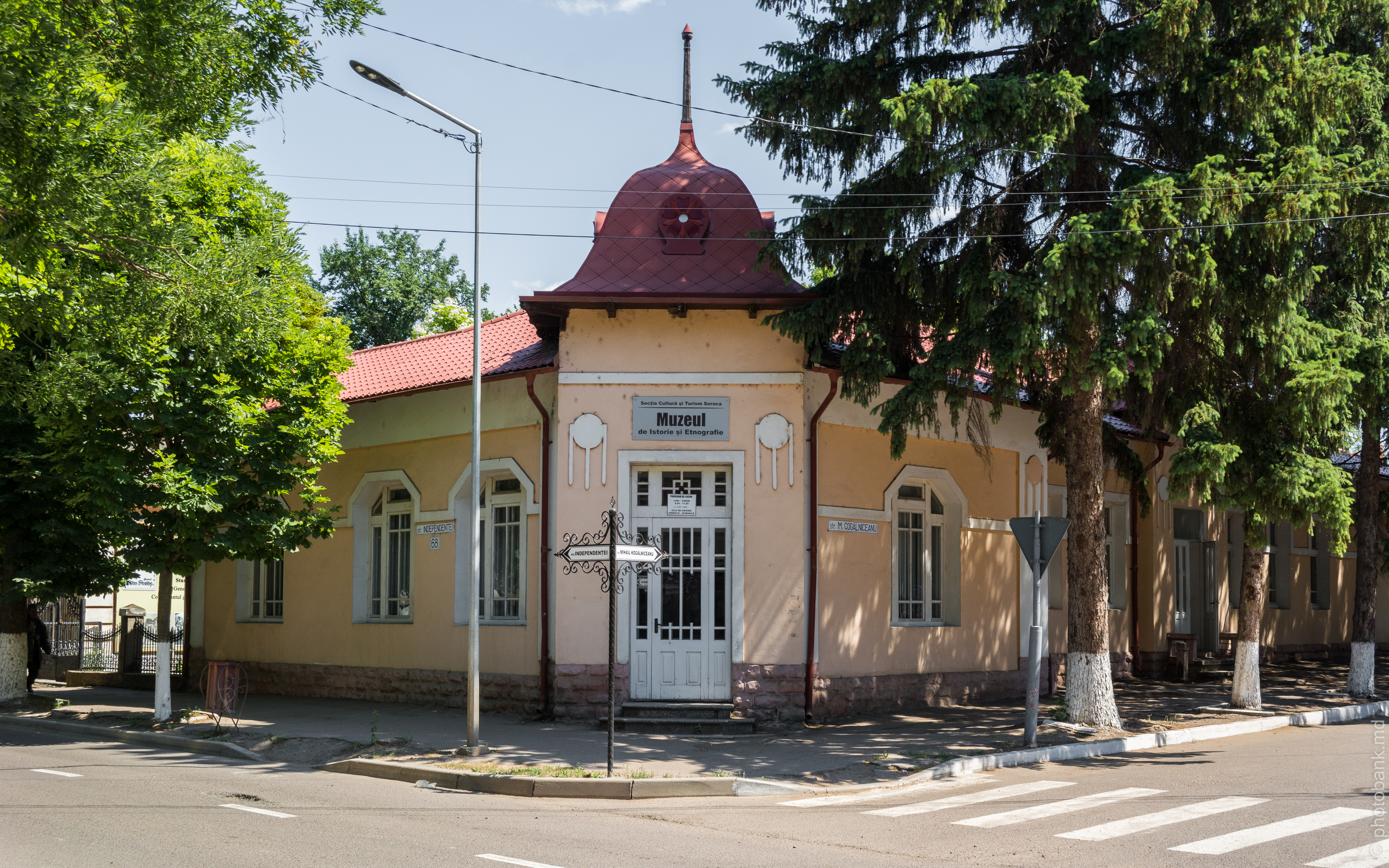
Museum

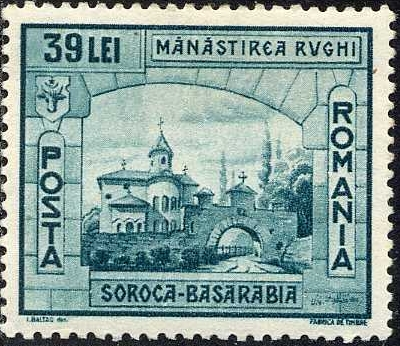
Rudi Monastery

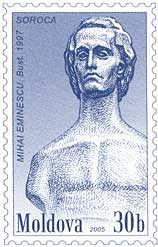
Mihai Eminescu

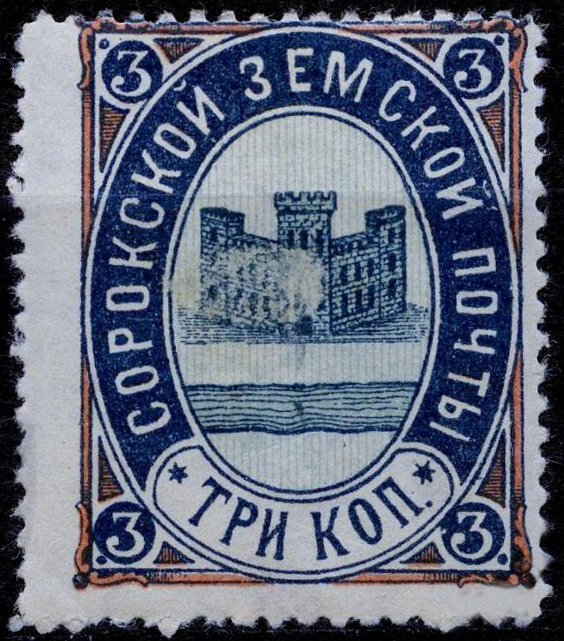
Soroca 1898 local stamp

== International relations ==
=== Twin towns – Sister cities ===
Soroca is twinned with:

- Bryansk, Russia
- Flămânzi, Romania
- Suceava, Romania

== See also ==
- History of the Jews in Bessarabia
- Romani people in Romania
- Armenians in Moldova
