= Roads in Moldova =

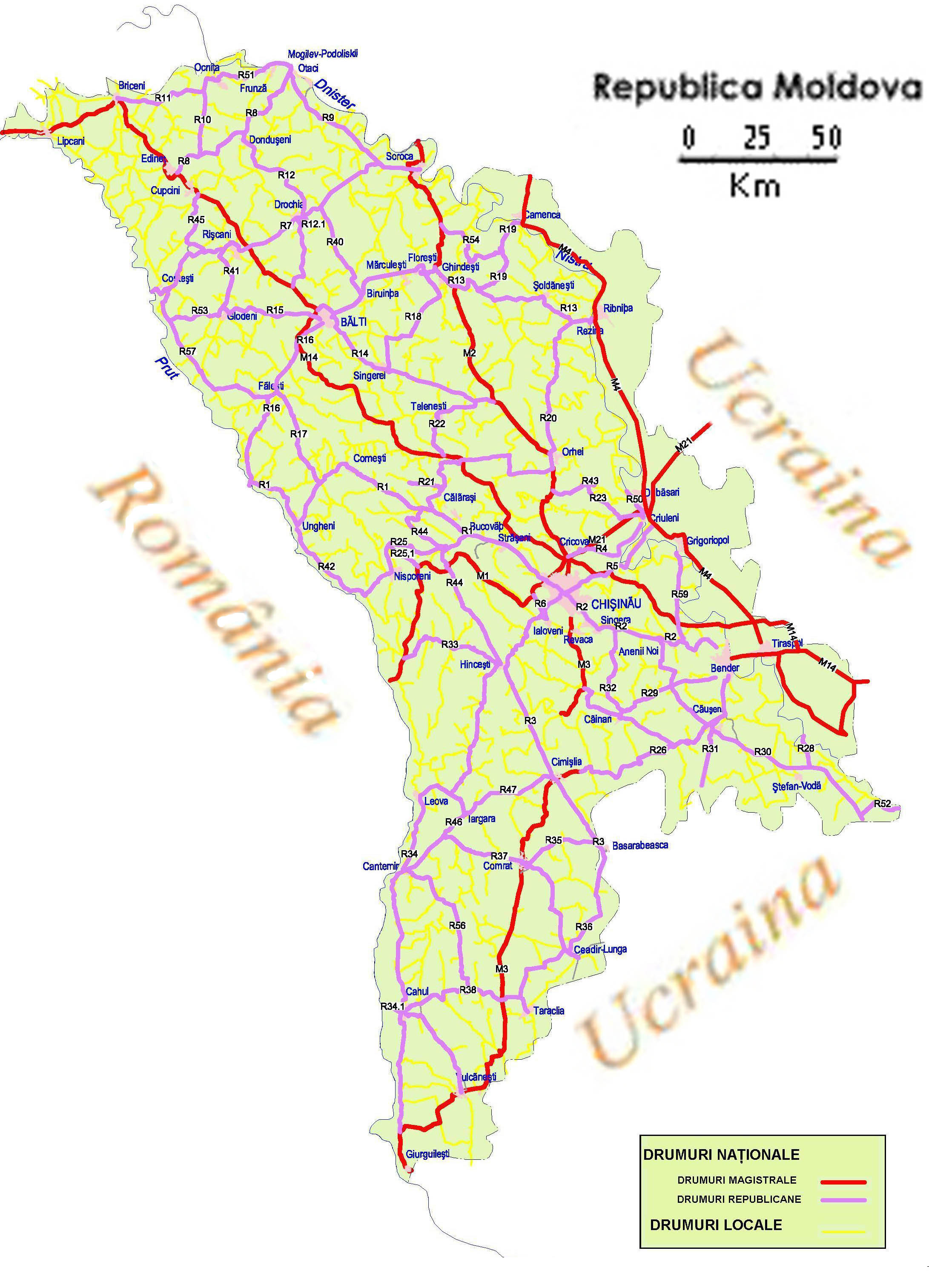
Map of Moldovan roads. Red represents magistral roads, purple represents republican roads, and yellow represents local roads

Currently, there are three defined types of public roads in the Republic of Moldova:

- National road (Romanian: Drum național – pl. Drumuri naționale)
- Local road (Romanian: Drum local – pl. Drumuri locale)
- Street (Romanian: Stradă – pl. Străzi)

In total, Moldova has a total length of 10,680 kilometres (6,636 mi) of road. From those, 3,668 km (2,279 mi) are national roads and 7,012 km (4,357 mi) are local roads. The general maximum speed limit on public roads is 90 km/h (55 mph), while a speed limit of 50 km/h (30 mph) is imposed inside localities.

Its current road network is inherited from the former Soviet Union (the Moldavian SSR).

== Vignette ==
Moldova is the only country which requires use of vignettes (roviniete) on all public roads, inside and outside localities, as a form of road tolling for all non-Moldovan vehicles. Vignettes are available for purchase at border crossing points, with 2023 prices from €4 for a week up to €180 for a year. Drivers caught without a valid vignette are charged with cash fines starting from MDL 5,000 (€231).

== Motorways ==

The Ungheni-Odesa Motorway has the planned route Ungheni-Chișinău-Palanca within the territory of the Republic of Moldova.

As of 2021, there are no segments of motorway (Romanian: Autostradă) that are officially open. The first motorway-class road in Moldova is planned to be the Chișinău - Cimișlia motorway, which is to be assigned "M3". Works on what could be the first motorway began in the 80s (under Soviet rule), but began to slow down after the dissolution of the Soviet Union in 1991, stopping in 1996 with the Chișinău - Porumbrei segment (32 km or 20 mi) open only on one carriageway. Works on what could eventually become the first motorway in Moldova resumed in 2019.

Thus, it can be said that Moldova has de facto 32 km (20 mi) of motorway in service, but de jure the Chișinău - Porumbrei segment does not count as a motorway, with plans calling for the Chișinău - Cimișlia road to receive motorway status only after works are finished.

In 2018, a second motorway route in Moldova (Ungheni - Chișinău - border with Ukraine toward Odesa) was proposed as a continuation of Romania's A8 motorway to the east (est. 100 km or 62 mi long), and thus of the future motorway corridor Iași–Cluj-Napoca–Budapest–Vienna–Munich. In 2021, it had been proposed by the IDEP that the motorway segment between Chișinău and the Romanian border become a "national priority" for Moldova.

== National roads ==
National roads in Moldova are divided into two categories: magistral roads (Romanian: Drumuri magistrale) and republican roads (Romanian: Drumuri republicane). Magistral roads mainly serve as connections to road networks of neighboring countries, those of Romania and Ukraine. Republican roads serve as connections between places in Moldova, but may also reach the border. All magistral roads start or pass through the capital city of Chișinău, with the exception of the M4.

=== M1 highway ===
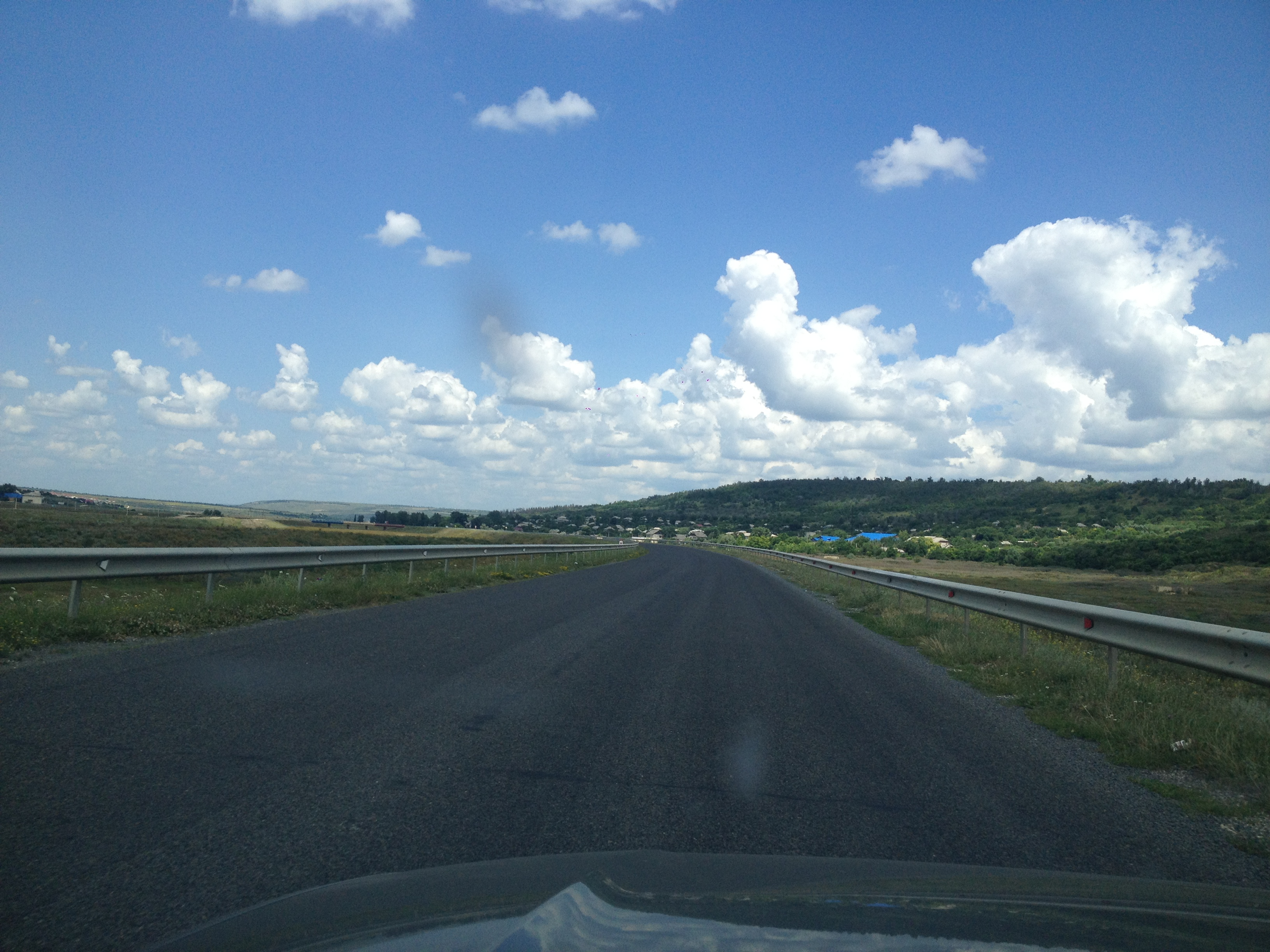
The M1 approaching the Romanian border, near Leușeni.

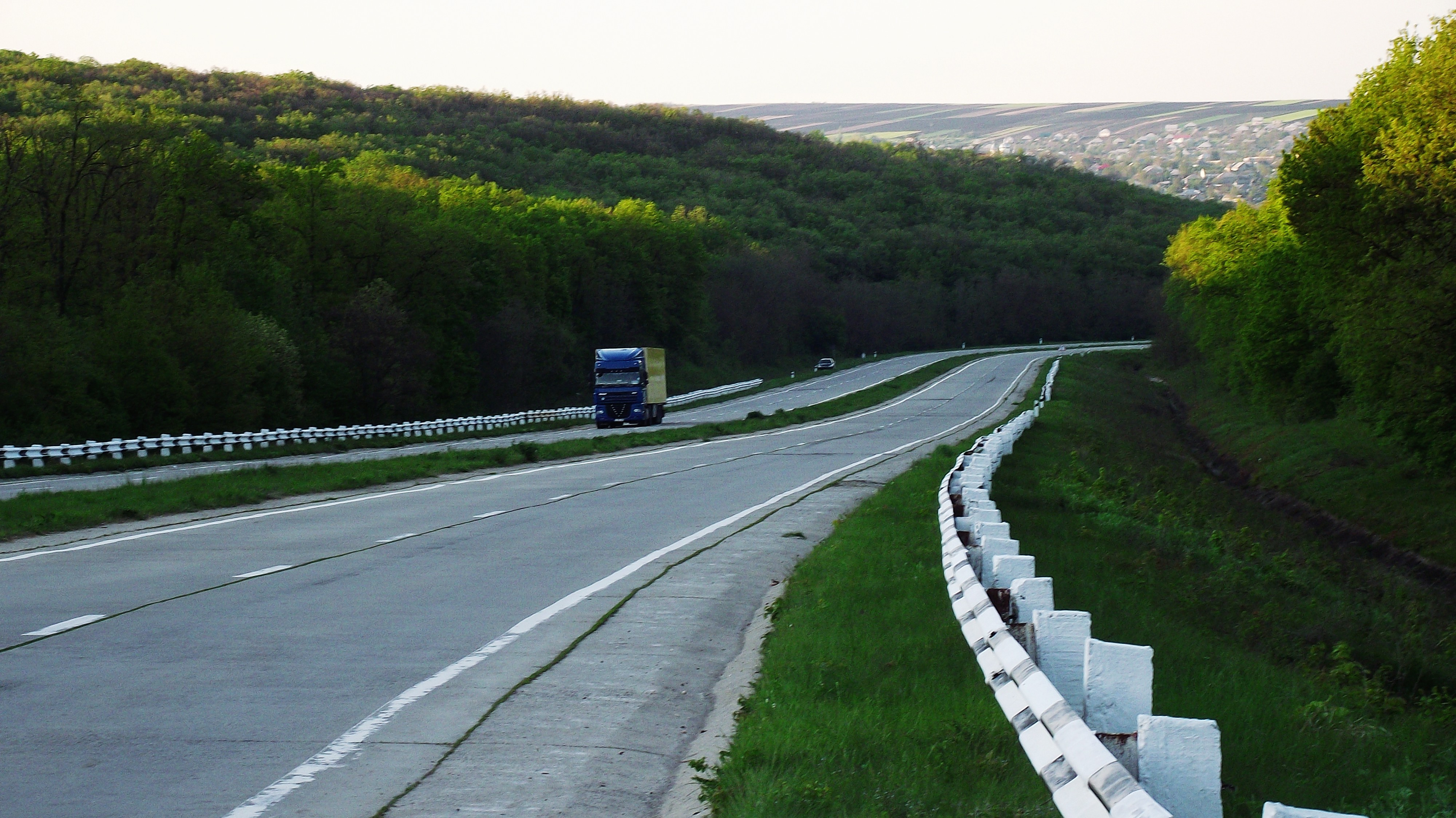
The M3 between Răzeni and Porumbrei.

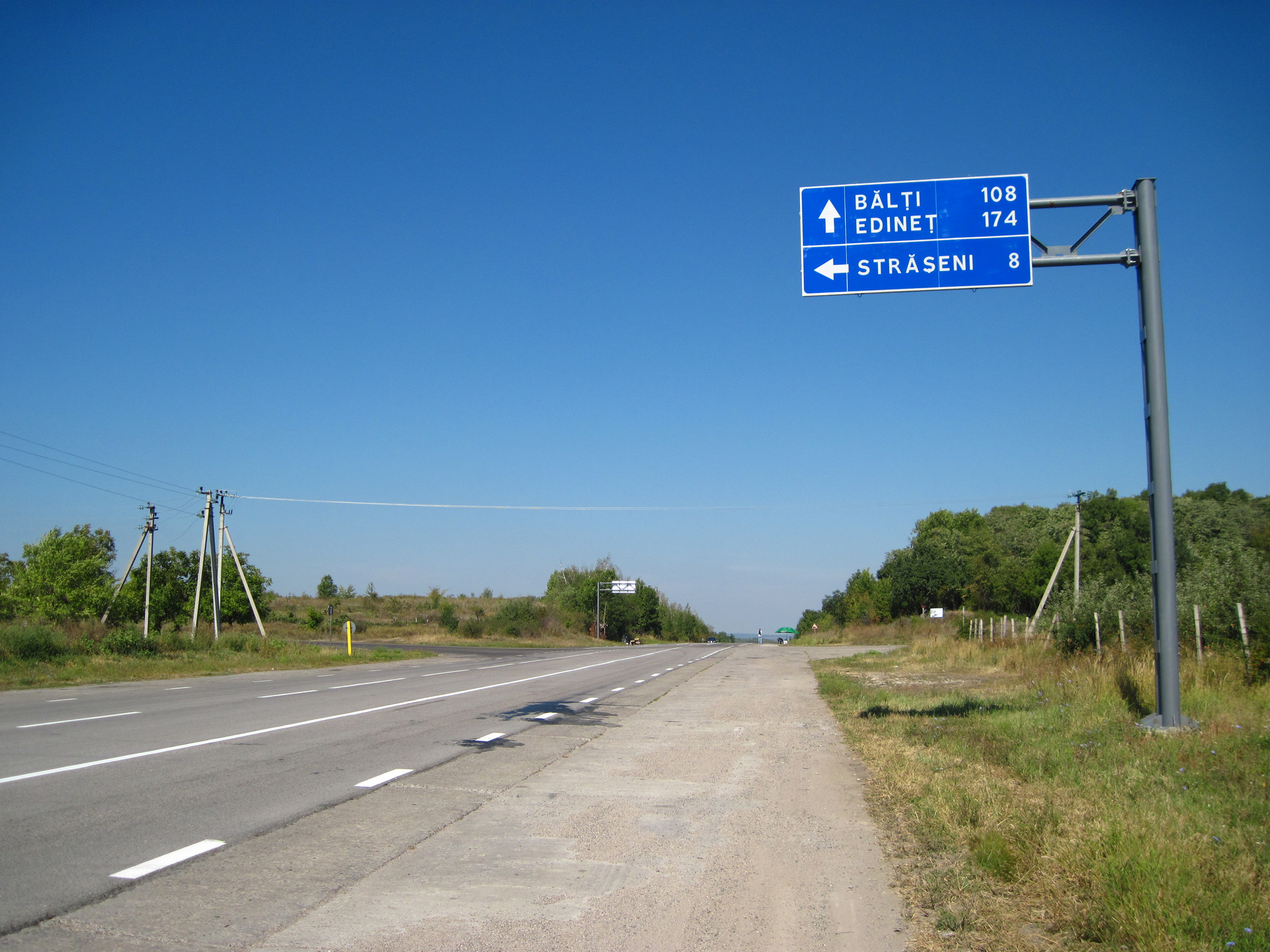
The M5 near Negrești, at the intersection with local road L443.

The M1 crosses Moldova on the west - east reference, linking the border with Ukraine at Dubău to the Romanian border at Leușeni, Hîncești towards Bucharest and further Romanian cities, also passing through Chișinău and Dubăsari.

With a total length of 154 km (96 mi), modern-day M1 comprises 97 km (60 mi) between the Romanian border and Chișinău, to which are added 60 km (37 mi) of the former M21 highway towards the Ukrainian border, M21 having been merged into the M1.

=== M2 highway ===
The M2 is one of the magistral roads that link Chișinău to the border with Ukraine. The road, which is 185 km (115 mi) long, passes through Orhei and Soroca before reaching the border at Cosăuți. There's currently no bridge over the Dniester river in the area, with this gap covered by a ferry. Work on building a 1,400m dual carriageway bridge is scheduled for 2025.

=== M3 highway ===
The M3 serves as a connection between Chișinău and the Moldova–Romania border; this time towards the proposed Lower Danube metropolitan area (which includes the Romanian cities of Galați and Brăila) via the autonomous territory of Gagauzia. The main cities crossed by the road include Cimișlia, Comrat and Vulcănești, ending near the tripoint of Moldova and its two surrounding countries at Giurgiulești. It is 217 km (135 mi) long.

Future plans call for the Chișinău - Cimișlia section to become a motorway-class road, the first motorway in Moldova.

=== M4 highway ===
The M4 is the only road that doesn't start or pass through Chișinău and of which all segments are in the control of the Transnistrian government. The road forms the backbone of the Transnistrian road network as it links all the main cities located in the territory: Tiraspol, Dubăsari and Rîbnița, with its northern terminus at the border with Ukraine. It is 178 km (111 mi) long.

=== M5 highway ===
The M5 (M14 CIS) is the longest Moldovan road, at 370 km (230 mi), crossing Moldova on the north - south reference. It passes through the three most populous Moldovan cities (Chișinău, Bălți and Tiraspol), as well as Edineț.

The designation "M14" dates back to the era of the Soviet Union. The Soviet M14 highway served as a link between the present-day border with Poland at Brest (Byelorussian SSR) and the city of Odesa (Ukrainian SSR) on the Black Sea coast. After the dissolution of the Soviet Union in 1991, the designation of the former M14 was retained on the Moldovan section, while the sections in Ukraine and Belarus have gotten new designations. It was later renamed to M5.

=== List ===
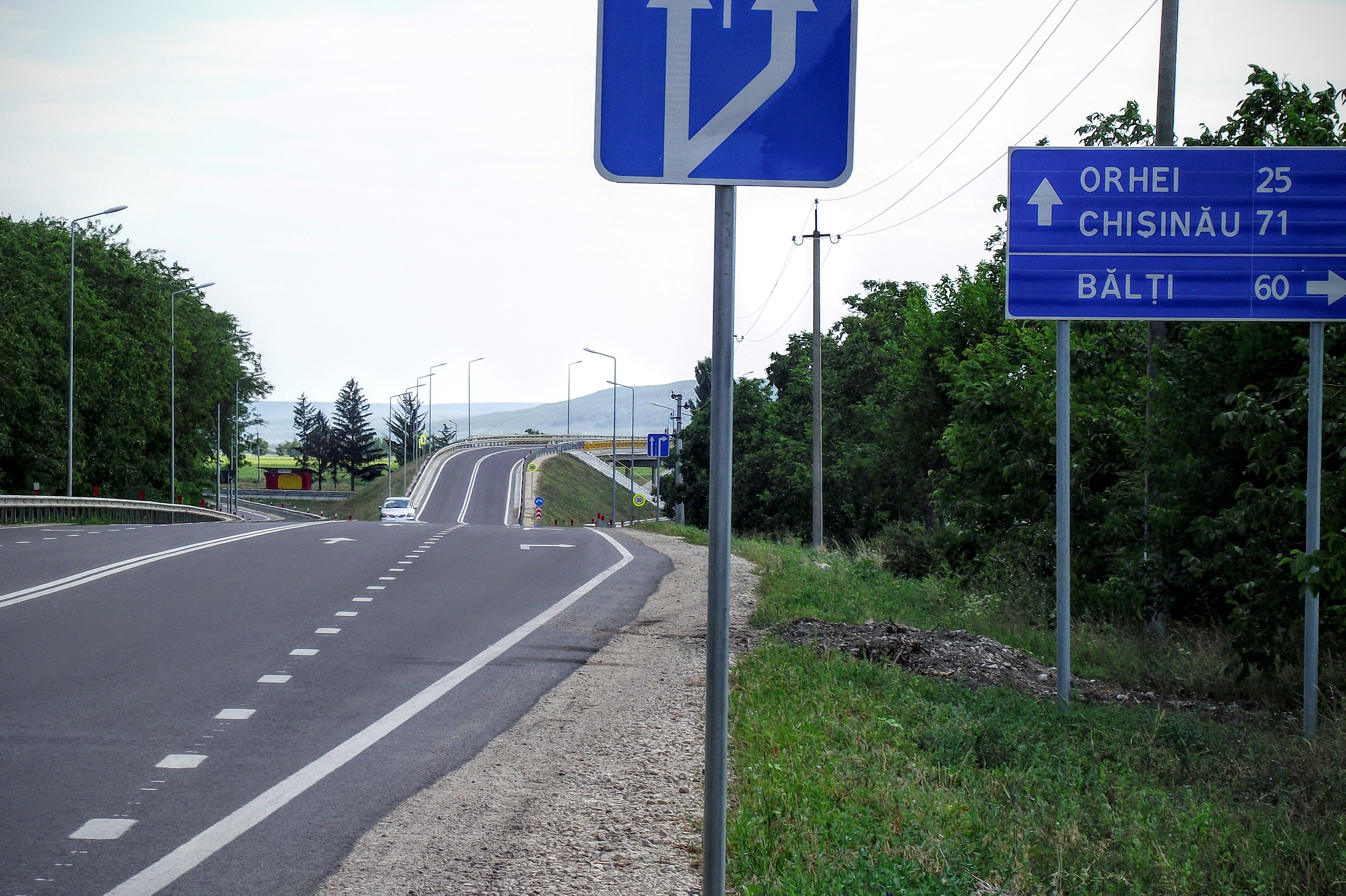
Some intersections between Moldovan trunk roads use interchanges, like here at the M2-R14 junction. This is common in former Soviet states.

List of magistral roads
Number	Route	Length	
Number	Route	km	mi
M 1	Ukraine → Dubăsari – Chișinău – Leușeni → Romania	154	96
M 2	Chișinău – Orhei – Soroca → Ukraine	155	96
M 2.1	M2 – Cosăuți	3.5	2.2
M 3	Chișinău – Cimișlia – Comrat – Vulcănești → Romania	217	135
M 3.1	M3 – Comrat East	4.3	2.7
M 4	Tiraspol – Dubăsari – Rîbnița – Hristovaia → Ukraine	178	111
M 5	Ukraine → Edineț – Bălți – Chișinău – Tiraspol → Ukraine	370	230
Total		1,082	672

List of republican roads
Number	Route	Length	
Number	Route	km	mi
R 1	Chișinău – Strășeni – Călărași – Ungheni → Romania	118	73
R 2	Chișinău – Tighina	60	37
R 3	Chișinău – Hîncești – Cimișlia → Ukraine	98	61
R 4	Chișinău – Criuleni – Dubăsari	32	20
R 5	Chișinău – Dorotcaia	32	20
R 6	Ialoveni – Dumbrava	6	3.7
R 7	Romania → Rîșcani – Drochia – Soroca	101	63
R 8	Edineț – Corbu – Otaci → Ukraine	55	34
R 9	Otaci – Soroca	40	25
R 10	Ruseni – Ocnița	19	12
R 11	Briceni – Ocnița	35	22
R 12	Bălți Airport – Drochia – Corbu	63	39
R 13	Bălți – Florești – Rîbnița	52	32
R 14	Bălți – Sîngerei – Sărătenii Vechi	66	41
R 15	Bălți – Glodeni	30	19
R 16	Bălți – Fălești – Sculeni → Romania	49	30
R 17	Fălești – Pîrlița	32	20
R 18	Sîngerei – Florești	45	28
R 19	Pohoarna – Sănătăuca	31	19
R 20	Călărași – Orhei – Rîbnița	114	71
R 21	Răciula – Hîrjauca	11	6.8
R 22	Meleșeni – Telenești – Ratuș	29	18
R 23	Ivancea – Criuleni	34	21
R 24	Strășeni – Căpriana	11	6.8
R 25	Bucovăț – Nisporeni – Bărboieni	46	29
R 26	Cimișlia – Căușeni – Bender – Tiraspol	103	64
R 27	Tiraspol – Corotna – Pervomaisc	49	30
R 28	Hlinaia – Răscăieții Noi	18	11
R 29	Răzeni – Bender	58	36
R 30	Chetrosu – Căușeni – Ștefan Vodă → Ukraine	95	59
R 31	Căușeni → Ukraine	18	11
R 32	Chetrosu – Sălcuța	51	32
R 33	Hîncești – Lăpușna – Leușeni	36	22
R 34	Hîncești – Cantemir – Cahul – Slobozia Mare	168	104
R 35	Comrat – Basarabeasca	26	16
R 36	Taraclia – Basarabeasca	61	38
R 37	Ceadîr-Lunga – Comrat – Cantemir	81	50
R 38	Taraclia – Cahul – Vulcănești	72	45
R 40	Biruința – Chetrosu	31	19
R 41	Rîșcani – Glodeni	19	12
R 42	Ungheni – Bărboieni	33	21
R 44	Călărași – Ciuciuleni – Hîncești	65	40
R 45	Edineț – Pîrjota	24	15
R 46	Cuporani – Iargara	10	6.2
R 47	Cimișlia – Sărata Nouă	39	24
R 49	Basarabeasca → Ukraine	4	2.5
R 50	Dubăsari – Criuleni	6	3.7
R 51	Otaci – Ocnița	26	16
R 52	Tudora – Palanca	14	8.7
R 53	Glodeni – Cobani	19	12
R 54	Cunicea – Soloneț	30	19
R 55	Briceni → Ukraine	3	1.9
R 56	Cantemir – Tartaul de Salcie	48	30
R 57	Fălești – Costești	59	37
R 59	Bulboaca – Delacău	29	18
Total		2,504	1,556

== Local roads ==
In Moldova, local roads mainly serve as links between district administrative centers and villages/communes located in the specific district, as well as between one village/commune and another. They are maintained by the appropriate local authorities depending on their location, previously being maintained by the national state-owned company Administrația de Stat a Drumurilor (ASD) until 2017. Since then, the ASD solely maintains national roads, with the exception of those located in Transnistria.

== European routes ==
European routes (E-roads) passing through the Republic of Moldova:

- Class A:
  - E58: (Austria, Slovakia, Ukraine, Romania) - Ungheni - Călărași - Chișinău - Tiraspol - (Ukraine, Russia)
  - E87: (Ukraine) - Palanca - (Ukraine) - Giurgiulești - (Romania, Bulgaria, Turkey)
- Class B:
  - E581: (Romania) - Leușeni - Chișinău - Tiraspol - (Ukraine)
  - E583: (Romania) - Sculeni - Bălți - Edineț - Otaci - (Ukraine)
  - E584: (Ukraine) - Dubău - Dubăsari - Chișinău - Cimișlia - Comrat - Giurgiulești - (Romania)

== Transnistria ==
As an autonomous territory with limited recognition as an independent state, the authorities of Transnistria, which is internationally recognized as part of Moldova, have complete control of all road segments that pass through the breakaway territory. The M4 highway, which crosses Transnistria on the north–south reference, is in complete control of Transnistria, as well as parts of M1 and M5, and many segments of republican and local roads. The complete length of the Transnistrian road network totals 1,070 km (660 mi).
