= M1 highway (Moldova) =

Road in Moldova

M1 highway

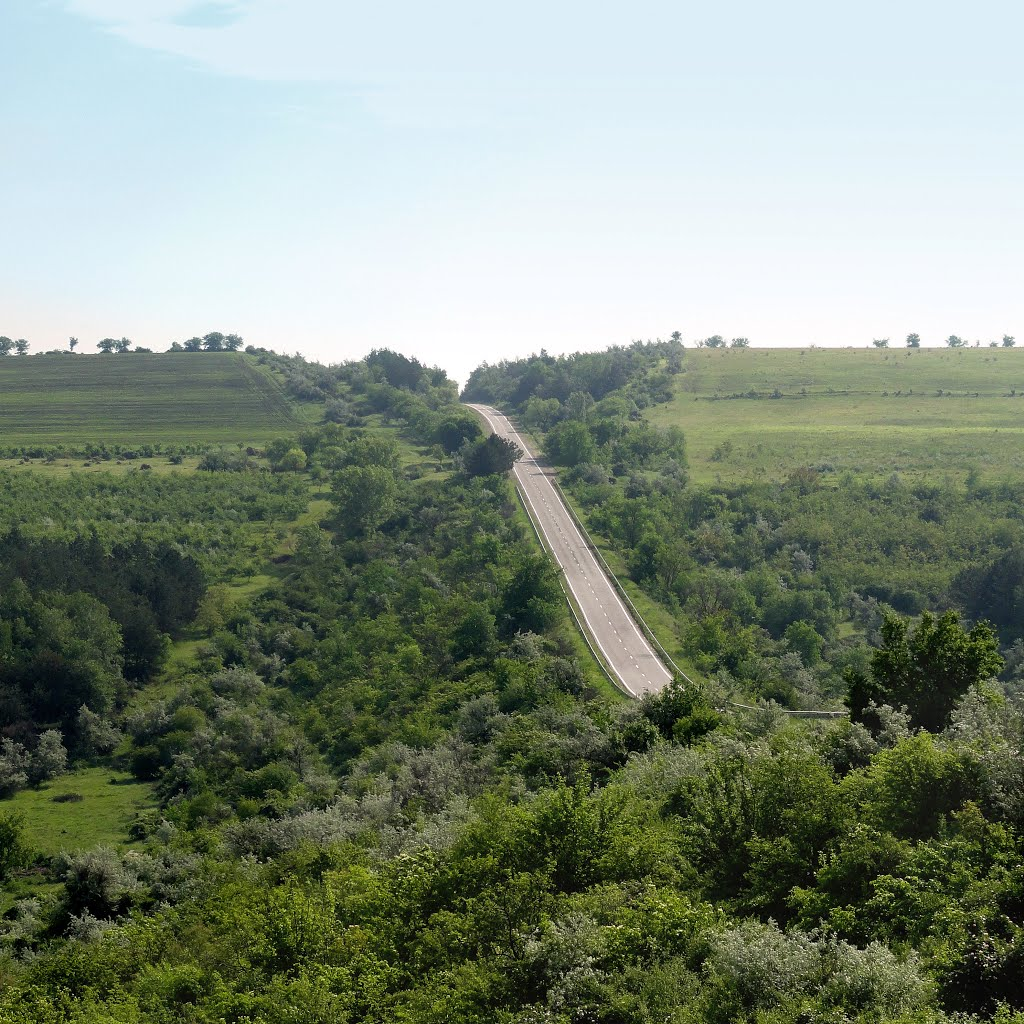
- M1 highway near Zăicana

Route information
- Part of E58 / E581 / E584
- Length: 154 km (96 mi)

Major junctions
- From: M 13 near Dubău; (Ukraine)
- M 4 at Dubăsari; M 2 / M 5 near Chișinău; R 1 near Chișinău
- To: DN24B at Leușeni; (Romania)

Location
- Country: Moldova
- Districts: Transnistria, Dubăsari, Criuleni, Chișinău, Ialoveni, Strășeni, Nisporeni, Hîncești
- Major cities: Dubăsari, Chișinău

Highway system
- Roads in Moldova

The M1 highway (Romanian: Drumul național M1) is a road in Moldova connecting the border with Ukraine near Dubău to the border with Romania at Leușeni, passing through Chișinău and Dubăsari. It is 154 km (96 mi) long and forms part of the European routes E58, E581 and E584.

== Route description ==
The first section, from Dubău to Chișinău via Dubăsari (57 km), used to have a different route number assigned (M21) until a government decision in 2016 decommissioned the number and integrated the route into the M1. South of Dubăsari, the road connects to the M4 highway, providing a connection to other cities administered by the separatist Transnistrian government, including the capital Tiraspol. Immediately after the roundabout, the road leaves the separatist-controlled territory, then heads south-west towards Chișinău, where it has a complex interchange with the M2 and M5 highways in the northern part of the capital city.

The road then forms Chișinău's north-western bypass as it reaches the intersection with the R6, which links Ialoveni to the M1 highway. The road then heads towards the Romanian border at Leușeni, meeting with the republican roads R44, R25 and R33, which connect Hîncești, Nisporeni and Călărași, respectively, with the M1 highway.

On its western end, it links to Romania's DN24B towards Huși, while on its eastern end it links to Ukraine's Highway M13 towards Kropyvnytskyi. On the Romanian side, immediately after the border crossing at Leușeni, the road connects also with DN28, towards the Romanian city of Iași. The road is thought as the main connection between Chișinău and Bucharest and other Romanian cities and further in the European Union as well.

== See also ==
- Roads in Moldova
- Transport in Moldova

== Gallery ==
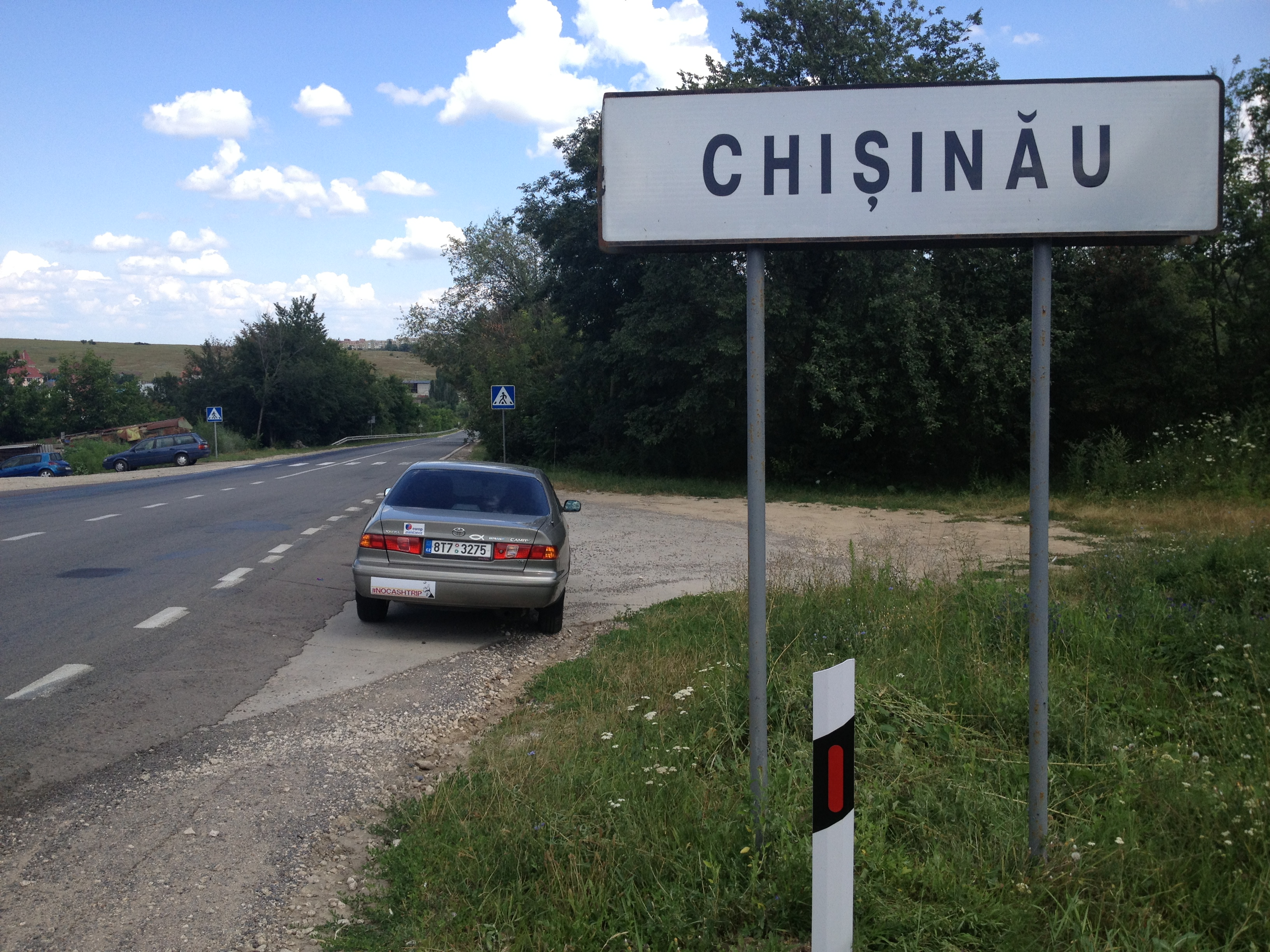
M1 highway entering Chișinău

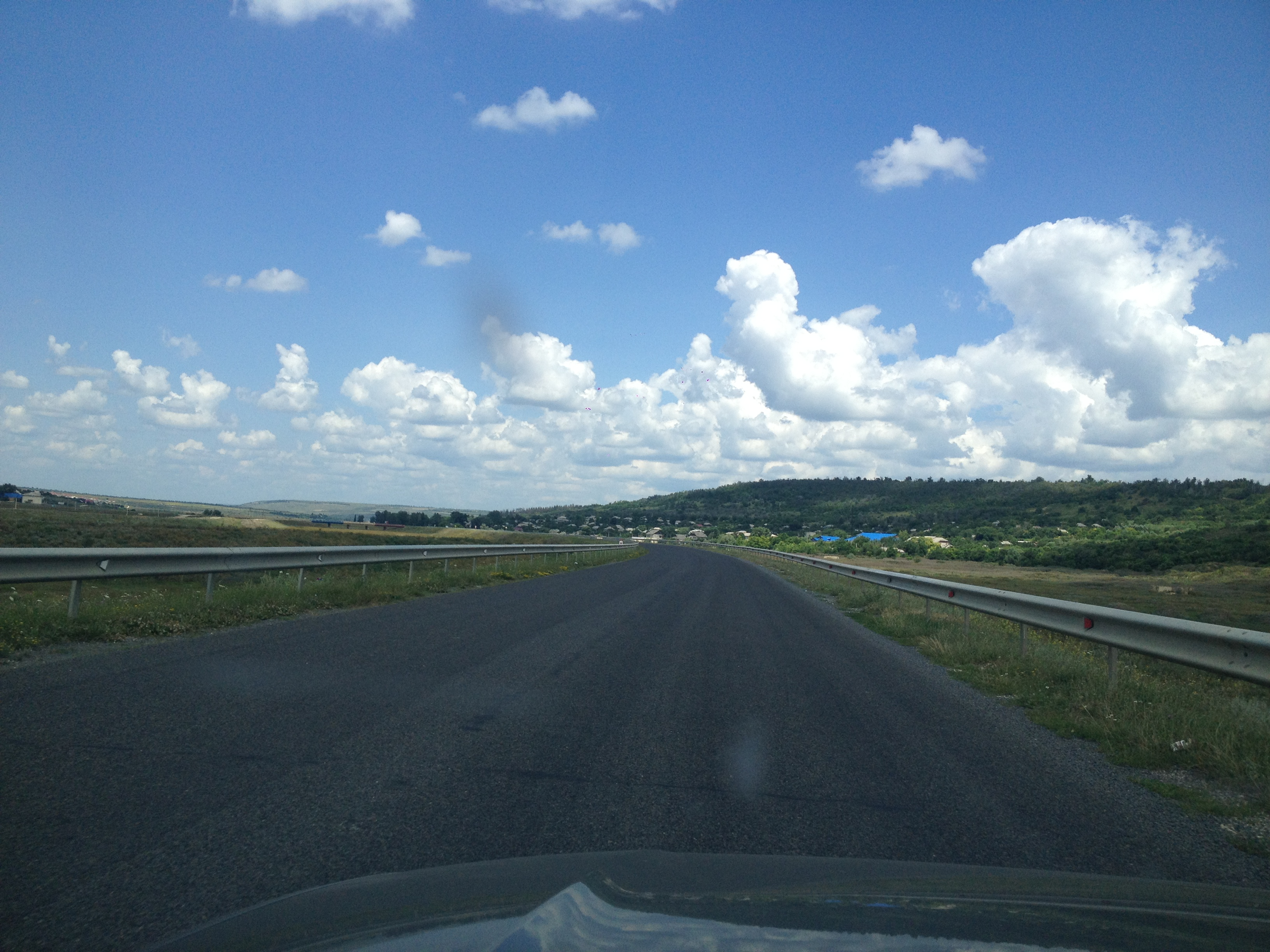
M1 highway near the Romanian border

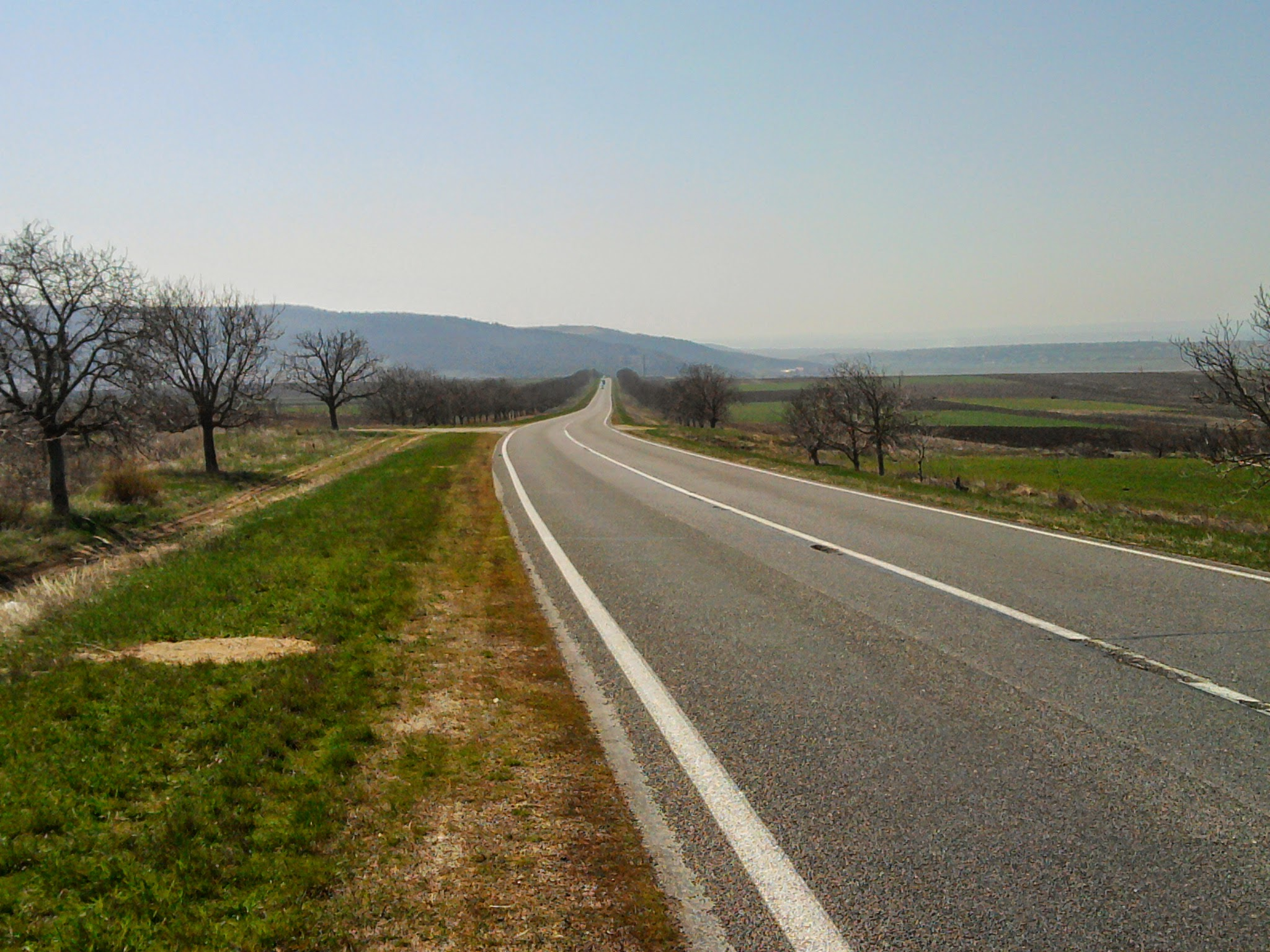
M1 highway near Leușeni
