= M21 highway (Moldova) =

Decommissioned road in Moldova

M21 highway

Route information
- Part of E58 / E581 / E584
- Length: 60 km (37 mi)

Major junctions
- From: M 1 / R 1 near Chișinău
- M 2 / M 5 near Chișinău; R 4 near Dubăsari; M 4 at Dubăsari
- To: M 13 near Dubău; (Ukraine)

Location
- Country: Moldova
- Districts: Chișinău, Criuleni, Dubăsari, Transnistria
- Major cities: Chișinău, Dubăsari

Highway system
- Roads in Moldova

The M21 highway (Romanian: Drumul național M21) was a road in Moldova, which linked Chișinău to the border with Ukraine near Dubău via Dubăsari. It was 60 km (37 mi) long, and formed part of the European route E584 of the International E-road network. Furthermore, it also shared a small segment with the E58 and E581 north-west of Chișinău.

In 2016, a government decision decommissioned the M21 and integrated the entirety of the route into the M1 highway.

== Route description ==
The M21 highway began at an intersection with the R1 road west of the capital city of Chișinău. Heading north-east, it then met with the M2, M14 (now dubbed "M5") and R4. This was the northern terminus of the M21's interference with the E58 and E581 and the southern terminus of the interference with the European route E584.

Between Chișinău and Dubăsari, the road doubled the republican road R4, which has its eastern terminus near Criuleni. The road then crossed the Dniester to reach the unrecognized state of Transnistria.

Immediately after entering the Transnistrian territory, the road reached a roundabout with the M4 highway, which provides access to Dubăsari, which the M21 bypassed in the south-east. The road then continued to head north-east to the border with Ukraine near Dubău, from where it continues as the Ukrainian highway M13, towards Kropyvnytskyi.

== See also ==
- Roads in Moldova
- Transport in Moldova

== Gallery ==
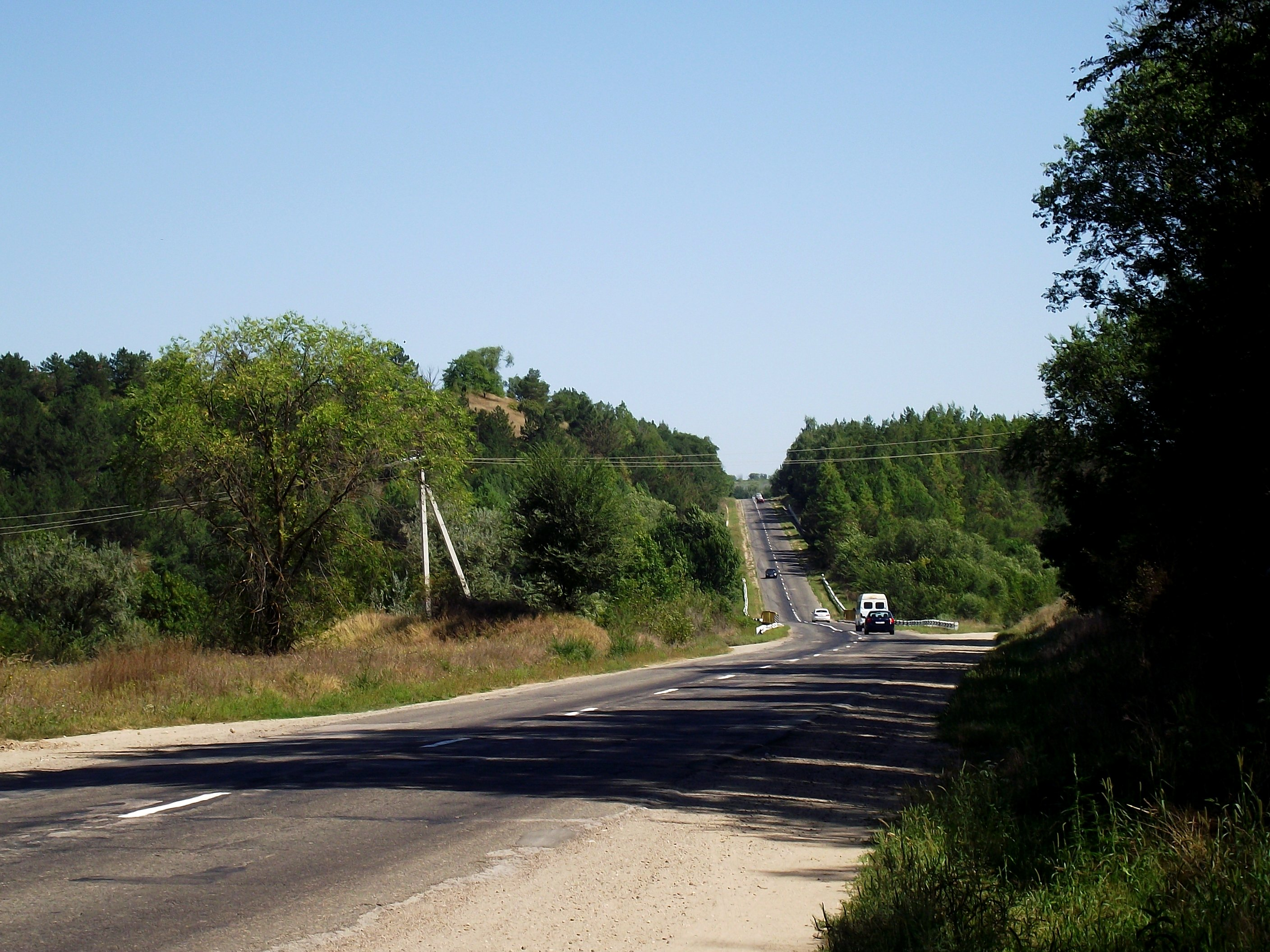
M21 highway near Hrușova

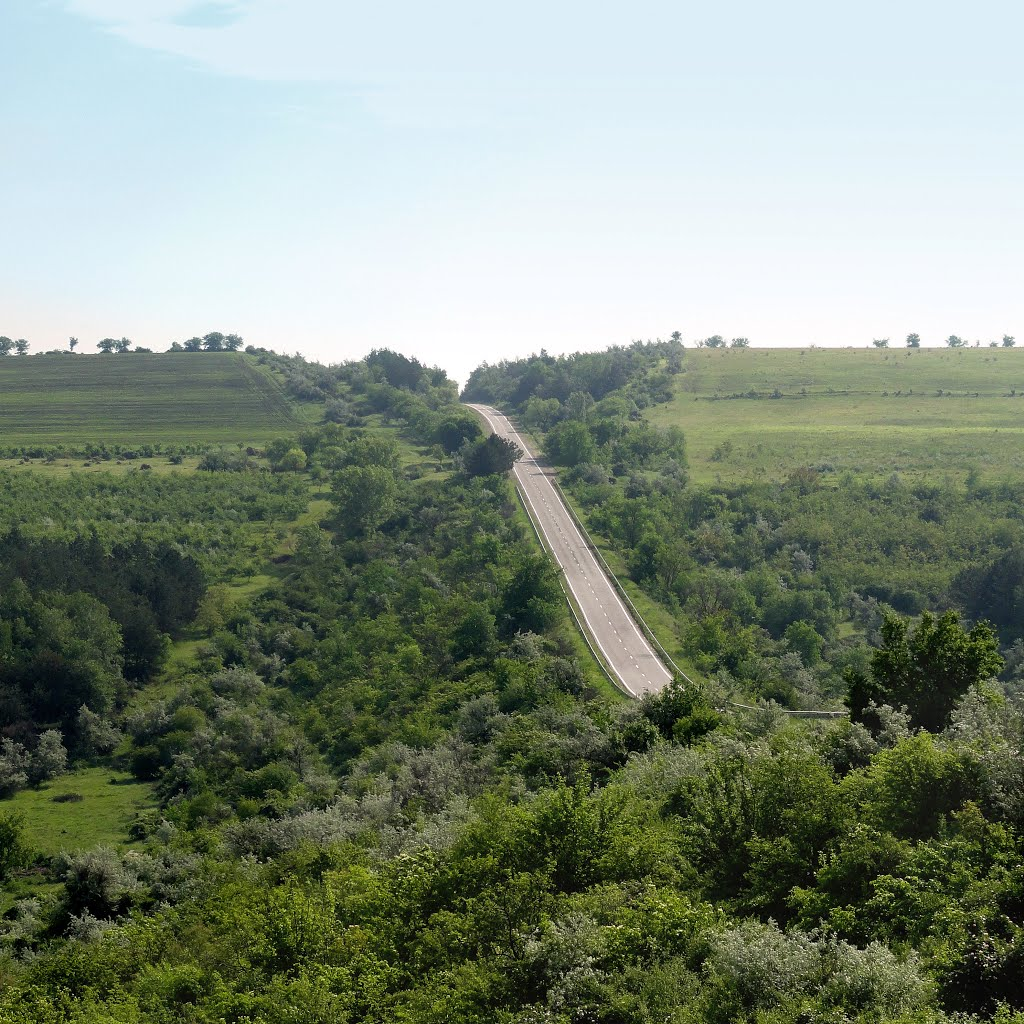
M21 highway near Zăicana
