= Ungheni–Odesa motorway =

Proposed motorway in Moldova

Route information
- Length: 220 km (140 mi) (estimated length)

Major junctions
- From: Ungheni; (Romania)
- To: (Ukraine)

Location
- Country: Moldova

Highway system
- Roads in Moldova

Since 2018, there have been proposals for the building of a motorway in Moldova between Ungheni (border with Romania) and Chișinău, and from there to the border with Ukraine towards Odesa, as an extension of the Romanian A8 motorway from its eastern terminus near Iași. The total cost of the project is 1 billion euro, for a total length estimated to be at around 220 km (140 mi). The motorway would serve as an extension to the future motorway corridor Iași–Cluj-Napoca–Budapest–Vienna–Munich.

Between Chișinău and the Romanian border, the motorway would run along the routes of the R1 and M5 highways. From Chișinău to the Ukrainian border, there have been two options discussed for the route of the motorway: through the unrecognized state of Transnistria or through the districts of Căușeni and Ștefan Vodă.

Some NGOs claim that an extension of the motorway to Odesa would be convenient for the European Union, as it facilitates freight transit between Asia and Europe through the Port of Odesa, which is one of the largest ports located in the Black Sea basin.

== History and status ==
In 2021, the Institute for Project Development and Expertise (IDEP) proposed that the motorway between Ungheni and Chișinău becomes a national priority for Moldova, as it would benefit the economy in the Eastern European region (and thus of Moldova's) in the sense of attracting investment and jobs, and that it would even "boost European integration of Moldova". In the meantime, the governments of Romania and Moldova reached an agreement for the connection of the Romanian A8 motorway to Moldova's current road network through a new bridge across the Prut river. Discussions are yet to start on the Ukrainian part.

As of 2022, the motorway is undergoing feasibility studies. All current estimations for the finalization of construction works on the motorway point to 2030 the earliest. In January 2024 funding from the European Investment Bank was obtained to prepare a feasibility study due for presentation in late 2025.

== See also ==
- Roads in Moldova
- Transport in Moldova
