= Leușeni =

Leuşeni may refer to several places in Moldova:

- Leuşeni, Hînceşti, a commune in Hînceşti district
- Leuşeni, Teleneşti, a commune in Teleneşti district
