= M2 highway (Moldova) =

Road in Moldova

M2 highway

Route information
- Part of E584
- Length: 185 km (115 mi)

Major junctions
- From: Chișinău
- M 5 / M 21 near Chișinău; R 20 near Orhei; R 14 near Codrul Nou; R 7 near Soroca; M 2.1 near Cosăuți
- To: P08 near Cosăuți; (Ukraine)

Location
- Country: Moldova
- Districts: Chișinău, Criuleni, Orhei, Telenești, Florești, Soroca
- Major cities: Chișinău, Orhei, Soroca

Highway system
- Roads in Moldova

The M2 highway (Romanian: Drumul național M2) is a road in Moldova connecting Chișinău to Soroca via Orhei, then to the border with Ukraine at Cosăuți. Its total length is 185 km (115 mi). The road forms a short segment of European route E584 of the International E-road network, north of Chișinău.

Near the border with Ukraine, the road has a ramification designated the M2.1, designed to serve as the access road to Cosăuți (3.5 km).

== Route description ==
Starting in Chișinău, it begins to head north until reaching the junction with the M14 and M21 highways, as well as with the republican road R4. This is Moldova's largest, busiest and most complex interchange, handling over 77K vehicles per day as of 2021. Moreover, this is the northern terminus of the interference with the E584; its southern terminus is inside Chișinău.

From Chișinău, the road continues to head north to Orhei, which it bypasses in the west. There, the road meets the republican road R20, which links it to the M14 highway in the west and to the unrecognized state of Transnistria in the east. The road then heads north-west toward a trumpet junction with the R14, towards Bălți.

As the road continues to head towards Soroca, it meets the republican road R13, linking the M2 highway to Florești. Near Soroca, the road meets with the republican road R7, towards Drochia. The M2 highway bypasses Soroca in the west.

The M2 highway's northern terminus is at Cosăuți on the Dniester. There is no bridge on the M2 across the river; crossing to the other side of the Dniester requires using a ferry line. The Ukrainian city of Yampil is located on the said other side of the river, immediately after the ferry landing. In Ukraine, the road continues on as the P08 to Nemyriv. Construction of the bridge over the Dniester on the M2 highway is however planned as of 2022; they will be funded by the Ukrainian side, and will significantly reduce time spent on the road between Chișinău and the Ukrainian capital of Kyiv to five hours.

== See also ==
- Roads in Moldova
- Transport in Moldova

== Gallery ==
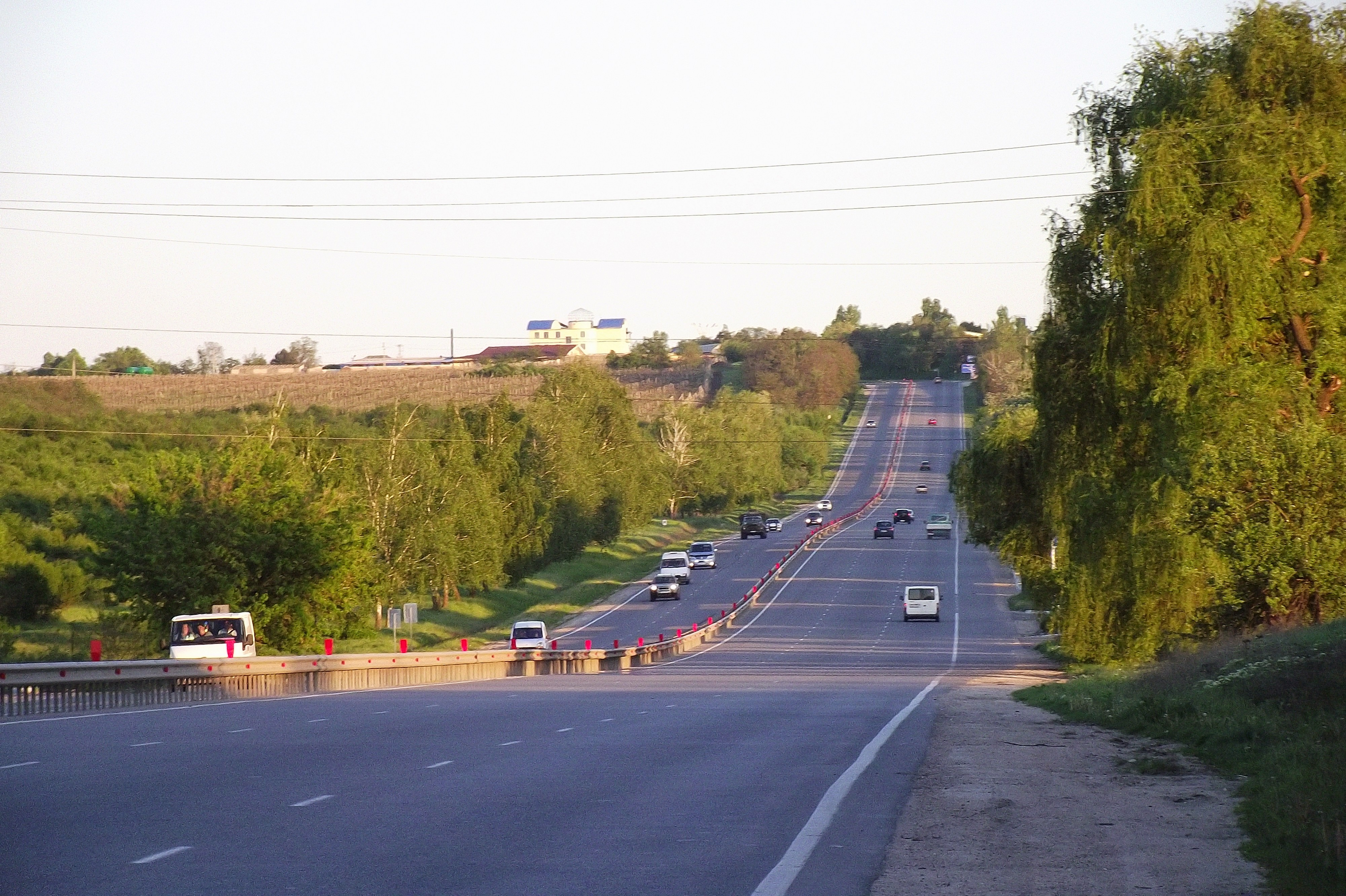
M2 highway near Chișinău

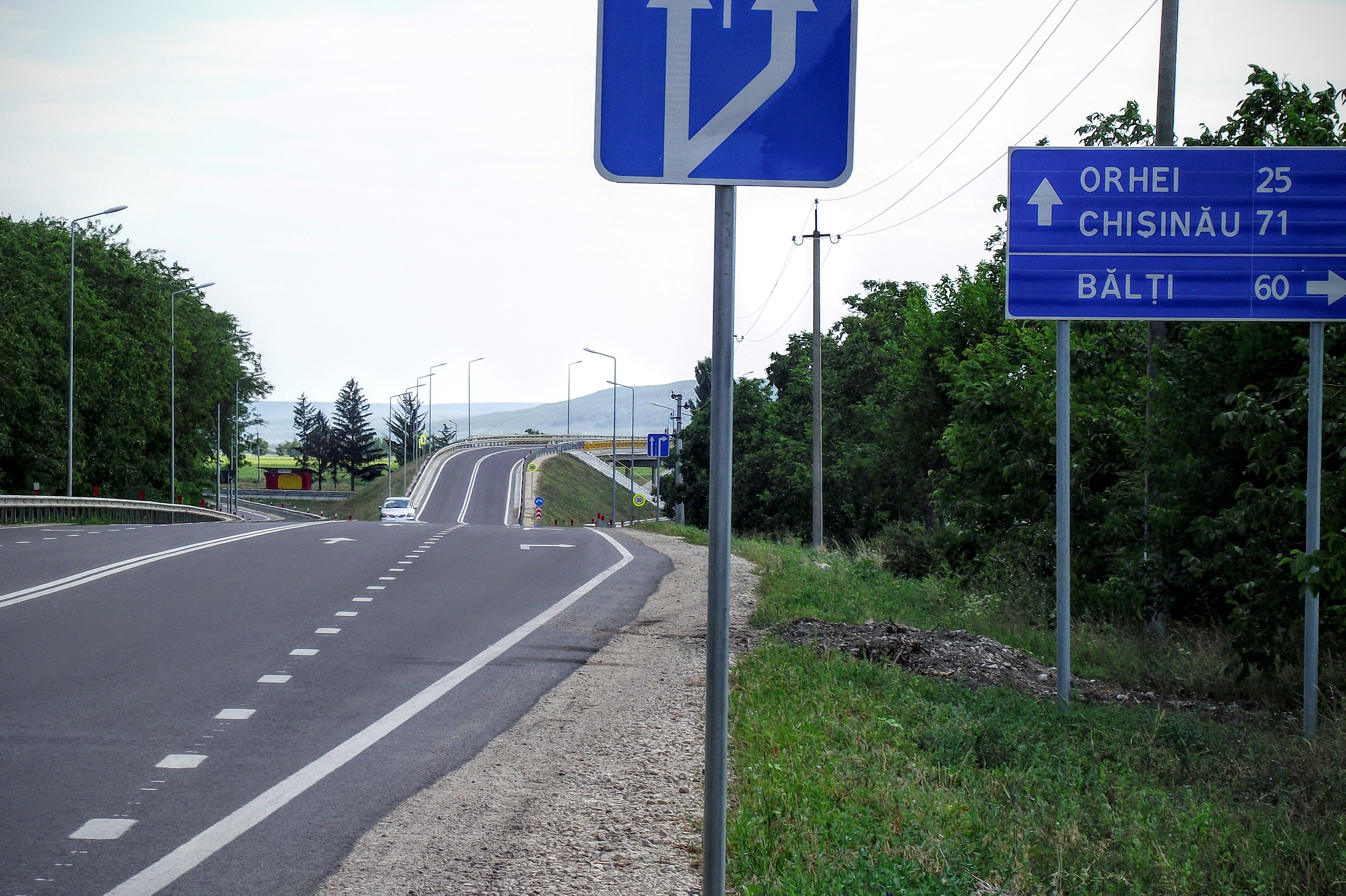
M2 highway at the junction with R14

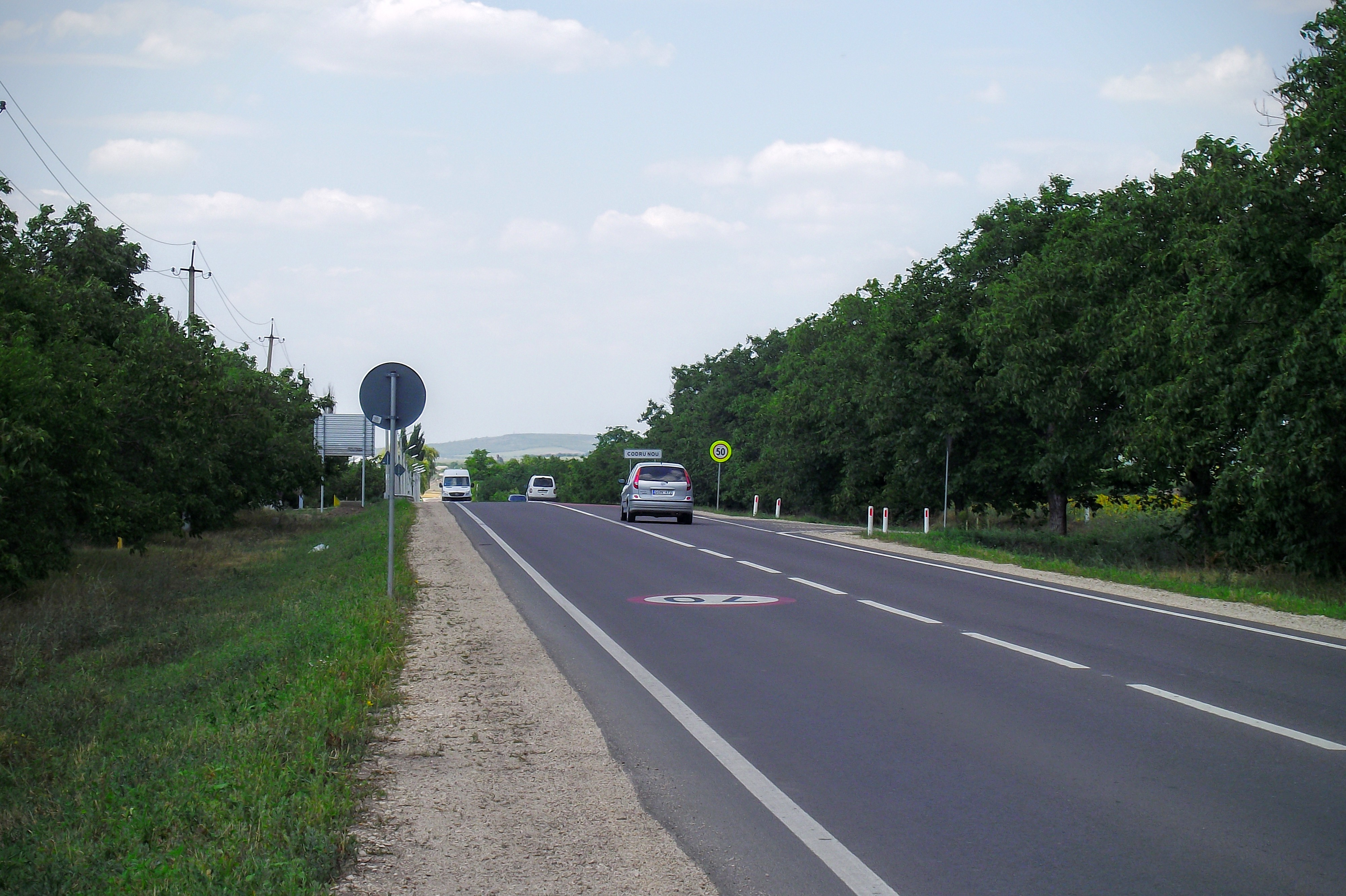
M2 highway entering the village of Codrul Nou
