= M4 highway (Moldova) =

Road in Moldova

M4 highway

Route information
- Length: 178 km (111 mi)

Major junctions
- From: R 26 at Tiraspol
- M 5 near Tiraspol; M 1 at Dubăsari; R 13 at Rîbnița; R 19 at Sănătăuca
- To: T0225 near Hristovaia; (Ukraine)

Location
- Country: Moldova
- Districts: Transnistria, Dubăsari
- Major cities: Tiraspol, Dubăsari, Rîbnița

Highway system
- Roads in Moldova

The M4 highway (Romanian: Drumul național M4) is a road in Transnistria, Moldova. It runs from the south to the north, being 178 km (111 mi) long, and links the Transnistrian capital of Tiraspol with Rîbnița via Dubăsari, reaching the border with Ukraine at Hristovaia, where it merges with the Ukrainian local road T0225. Running along the left bank of the Dniester for most of its length, it is the only road with magistral road status that does not start nor pass through the Moldovan capital of Chișinău.

== Route description ==
It begins in the Tiraspol city centre, branching off the republican road R26. Heading north, it reaches the junction with the M5 highway, which runs between the border with Ukraine (east, towards the port city of Odesa) and Chișinău in the west. The road then crosses around the area of Grigoriopol before reaching the M1 highway south of the city of Dubăsari.

The road continues to head north to Sănătăuca, where it stops following the Dniester, via Rîbnița, where it reaches republican road R13, towards Bălți. The road then reaches the border with Ukraine at Hristovaia, continuing as T0225 on the Ukrainian side.

The road is controlled in its entirety by the government of the unrecognized state of Transnistria, as the road primarily crosses through Transnistrian territory. However, near the city of Dubăsari, it crosses the de facto border between Moldova (Dubăsari District) and Transnistria on several occasions.

== See also ==
- Roads in Moldova
- Transport in Moldova
