= European route E58 =

Road in trans-European E-road network

E58

Route information
- Length: 2,200 km (1,400 mi)

Major junctions
- West end: Vienna, Austria
- East end: Rostov-on-Don, Russia

Location
- Countries: Austria; Slovakia; Ukraine; Romania; Moldova; Russia

Highway system
- International E-road network; A Class; B Class

European route E 58 is a road part of the International E-road network. It begins in Vienna, Austria, and passing through Slovakia, Ukraine, Romania and Moldova, ends in Rostov-on-Don, Russia. It is approximately 2,200 km (1,400 mi) long.

Since 2014, a part of the road in eastern Ukraine has been under the control of the separatist Donetsk People's Republic. During the 2022 Russian invasion of Ukraine, Russia took direct control of areas of the road in Donbas, Kherson Oblast and Zaporizhzhia Oblast.

== Route ==
- Austria
  - A 4: Vienna - Fischamend - Bruck an der Leitha
  - A 6: Bruck an der Leitha - Austria/Slovakia border
- Slovakia
  - D4: Austria/Slovakia border (Start of Concurrency with E75) - Bratislava
  - D1: (Start of Concurrency with E571) Bratislava - Senec - Trnava
  - R1: (End of Concurrency with E75) Trnava - Nitra - Zvolen
  - I/16: Zvolen
  - R2: Zvolen - Lučenec
  - I/16: Lučenec - Rimavská Sobota - Figa
  - R2: Figa - Tornaľa
  - I/16: Tornaľa - Rožňava - Košice (End of Concurrency with E571)
  - R4: (Start of Concurrency with E50) Košice
  - I/19: Košice - Michalovce - Slovakia/Ukraine border
- Ukraine
  - M 08: Slovakia/Ukraine border - Uzhhorod
  - M 06: (End of Concurrency with E50) Uzhhorod - Serednje - Mukachevo
  - M 24: (Start of Concurrency with E81) Mukachevo - Berehove
  - M 23: Berehove - Bene - Vylok
  - M 26: Vylok - Pyiterfolovo - Nevetlenfolu - Ukraine/Romania border
- Romania
  - DN1C: Ukraine/Romania border - Drăgușeni (End of Concurrency with E81)- Baia Mare - Mesteacăn - Bizușa-Băi - Dej
  - DN17: Dej - Bistrița - Piatra Fântânele - Poiana Stampei - Păltinoasa - Suceava - Ițcani (in Suceava) - Suceava
  - DN29: Suceava - Botoșani
  - DN28B: Botoșani - Târgu Frumos
  - DN28: Târgu Frumos - Iași
  - DN24: Iași - Cotu Morii - Sculeni - Romania/Moldova border
- Moldova
  - R 16: Romania/Moldova border - Sculeni
  - R 1: Sculeni - Petrești - Ungheni - Pîrlița - Bahmut - Călărași - Strășeni - Trușeni - Chișinău (Start of Concurrency with E581)
  - M 21: Chișinău
  - M 2: Interchange with M14, M21
  - M 5: Stăuceni - Gura Bodului - Entering Transnistria - Tiraspol - Pervomaisc - Moldova/Ukraine border
- Ukraine
  - M 16: Moldova/Ukraine border - Odesa (End of Concurrency with E581)
  - M 14: Odesa - Mykolaiv
  - P 06: Mykolaiv
  - M 14: Mykolaiv - Kherson - Nova Kakhovka - Melitopol - Pryazovske - Prymorsk - Manhush - Mariupol - Novoazovsk - Ukraine/Russia border
- Russia
  - R280: Ukraine/Russia border - Taganrog - Chaltyr - Rostov-on-Don
