= Highway M16 (Ukraine) =

Highway in Ukraine

Highway M16
- Автошлях М16
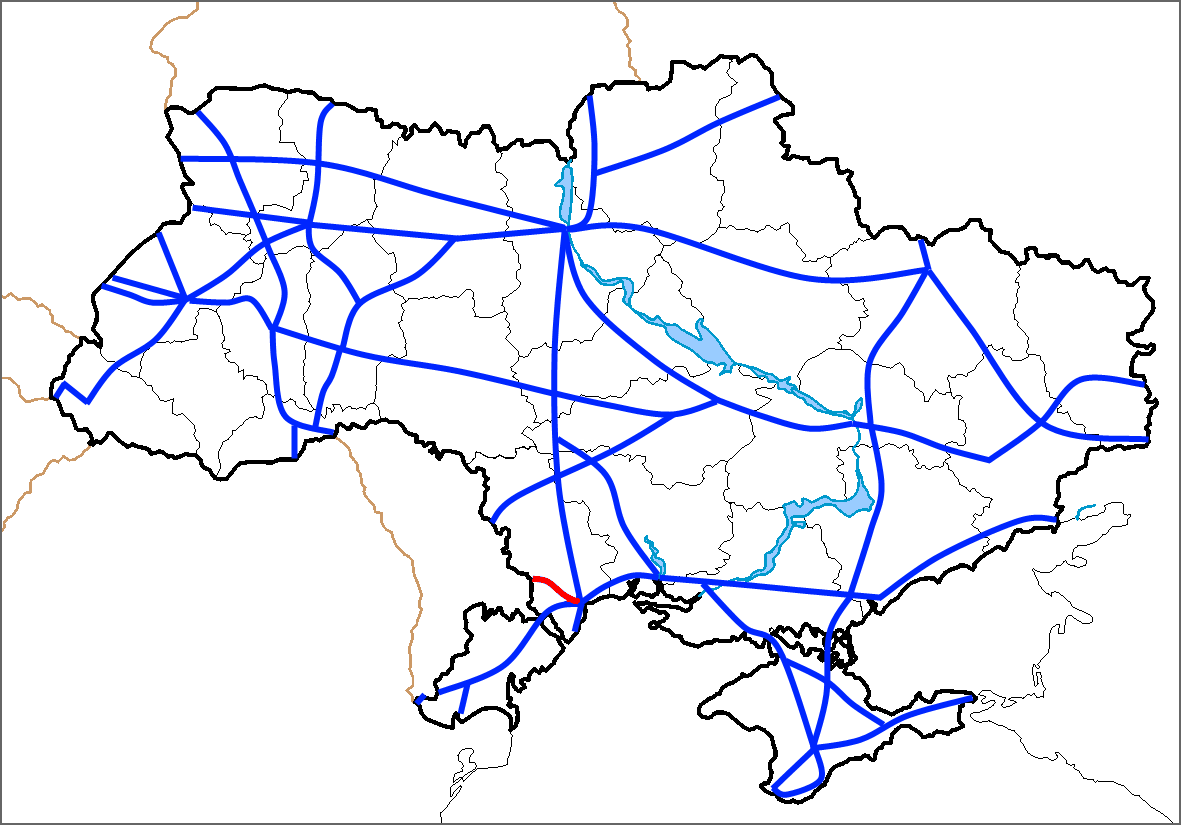

Route information
- Part of E58 / E581
- Length: 58.7 km (36.5 mi)

Major junctions
- East end: M 14 / M 05 / M 15 / M 27 in Odesa
- West end: Moldovan border in Kuchurhan

Location
- Country: Ukraine
- Oblasts: Odesa

Highway system
- Roads in Ukraine; State Highways

Highway M16 is a Ukrainian international highway (M-highway) connecting Odesa to Kuchurhan on the border with Moldova, where it continues as national road M5. The M16 is part of European route E58 and European route E581.

The M16 serves as a link between the longer M14 highway in Ukraine that runs from Odesa to the eastern border with Russia in Donetsk Oblast and the Moldovan M5 highway that traverses Moldova from the north to southeast towards Odesa.

== Junction list ==
Marker	Main settlements	Notes	Highway Interchanges
0 km	Odesa		E58 ( M 14) • E95 ( M 05) • E87 ( M 15) • M 27
59 km	Kuchurhan / Border with Moldova		E583 ( M 5)

== See also ==
- Roads in Ukraine
- Ukraine Highways
- International E-road network
- Pan-European corridors
