= European route E581 =

Road in trans-European E-road network

E581

Route information
- Length: 441 km (274 mi)

Major junctions
- From: Tișița, East Vrancea
- Tecuci, Bârlad, Huși, Chișinău
- To: Odesa

Location
- Countries: Romania, Moldova, Ukraine

Highway system
- International E-road network; A Class; B Class

European route E 581 is a European B class road in Romania, Moldova and Ukraine.

== Route ==
- Romania
  - DN24: Mărășești (E85) - Crasna
  - DN24B: Crasna - Albița
- Moldova
  - M 1: Leușeni - Chișinău
  - M 21: Chișinău
  - M 5: Chișinău - Pervomaisc
- Ukraine
  - M 16: Kuchurhan - Odesa
