= M5 highway (Moldova) =

Road in Moldova

M5 highway

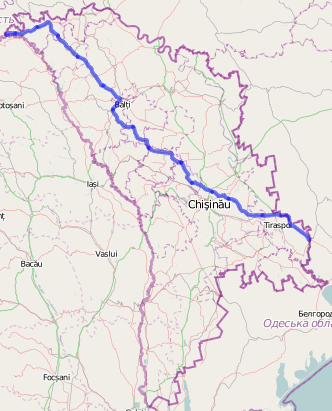

Route information
- Part of E58 / E581 / E583
- Length: 370 km (230 mi)
- History: Former route number: M14

Major junctions
- From: H 10 at Criva; (Ukraine)
- R 8 at Edineț; R 7 near Rîșcani; R 14 / R 16 near Bălți; M 1 / M 2 near Chișinău; R 5 at Budești; M 4 near Tiraspol
- To: M 16 at Pervomaisc; (Ukraine)

Location
- Country: Moldova
- Districts: Briceni, Edineț, Rîșcani, Bălți, Fălești, Sîngerei, Telenești, Călărași, Strășeni, Chișinău, Criuleni, Anenii Noi, Transnistria
- Major cities: Briceni, Edineț, Rîșcani, Bălți, Chișinău, Tiraspol

Highway system
- Roads in Moldova

The M5 highway (Romanian: Drumul național M5), during Soviet period referred to as the M14, is the longest road in Moldova, with a length of 370 km (230 mi) running from the north to the south-east. Having national road status, it is also one of the most important routes as it provides access to the three largest cities of Moldova within its internationally recognized borders: Bălți, Chișinău and Tiraspol. It forms part of the European routes E58, E581 and E583 of the International E-road network.

== Route description ==
It starts at the north-western border with Ukraine (Chernivtsi Oblast) in Criva, as a continuation of the Ukrainian H10 coming from Chernivtsi. The road heads east around 30 km to the town of Briceni from the border crossing. The town is served by the M5 through the local roads L20 and L41.

The road begins to head south afterwards to the city of Edineț, which the M5 bypasses in the west. The road from Edineț is part of the European route E583. Continuing to head south, near Rîșcani the M5 has a cloverleaf interchange with the republican road R7, providing access to the town, as well as to Drochia via the republican road R12 and, before reaching Bălți, it connects to Bălți International Airport. It then reaches Bălți, the second-largest city of Moldova and the location of the southern terminus of the interference with the E583, which it bypasses in the west as part of the Bălți ring road. From Bălți, the M5 heads south-east to the capital and largest city of Moldova, Chișinău.

North of Chișinău, the road meets with the M1 and M2, as well as the republican road R4 through a complex interchange. Being part of E583 and interfering with the European roads E58 and E581, the M5 bypasses the capital in the north-east. From the junction with the republican road R5, the road continues to head south-east to the border with the unrecognized state of Transnistria at Gura Bîcului. During the Transnistria War in 1992, the bridge that the M5 has over the Dniester river was blown up, and a gap was left in that area until 18 November 2017, when the bridge connecting Moldova and Transnistria reopened to traffic after reconstruction works have been completed.

The road in Transnistria is controlled by the separatist government from Tiraspol, rather than the Moldovan authorities. From the unrecognized border between the two states, the M5 heads east. North of Tiraspol, the capital of Transnistria and the third-largest city in Moldova within its internationally recognized borders, the M5 has a cloverleaf interchange with the M4, providing access to the city. The road bypasses Tiraspol in the north-east then heads towards the city of Odesa at the Black Sea coast, reaching the border with Ukraine (Odesa Oblast) at Pervomaisc. Here, the road merges with the Ukrainian M16, which in Odesa further connects with the Ukrainian M14 road, which runs along the coast towards the Russian border.

== See also ==
- Roads in Moldova
- Transport in Moldova

== Gallery ==
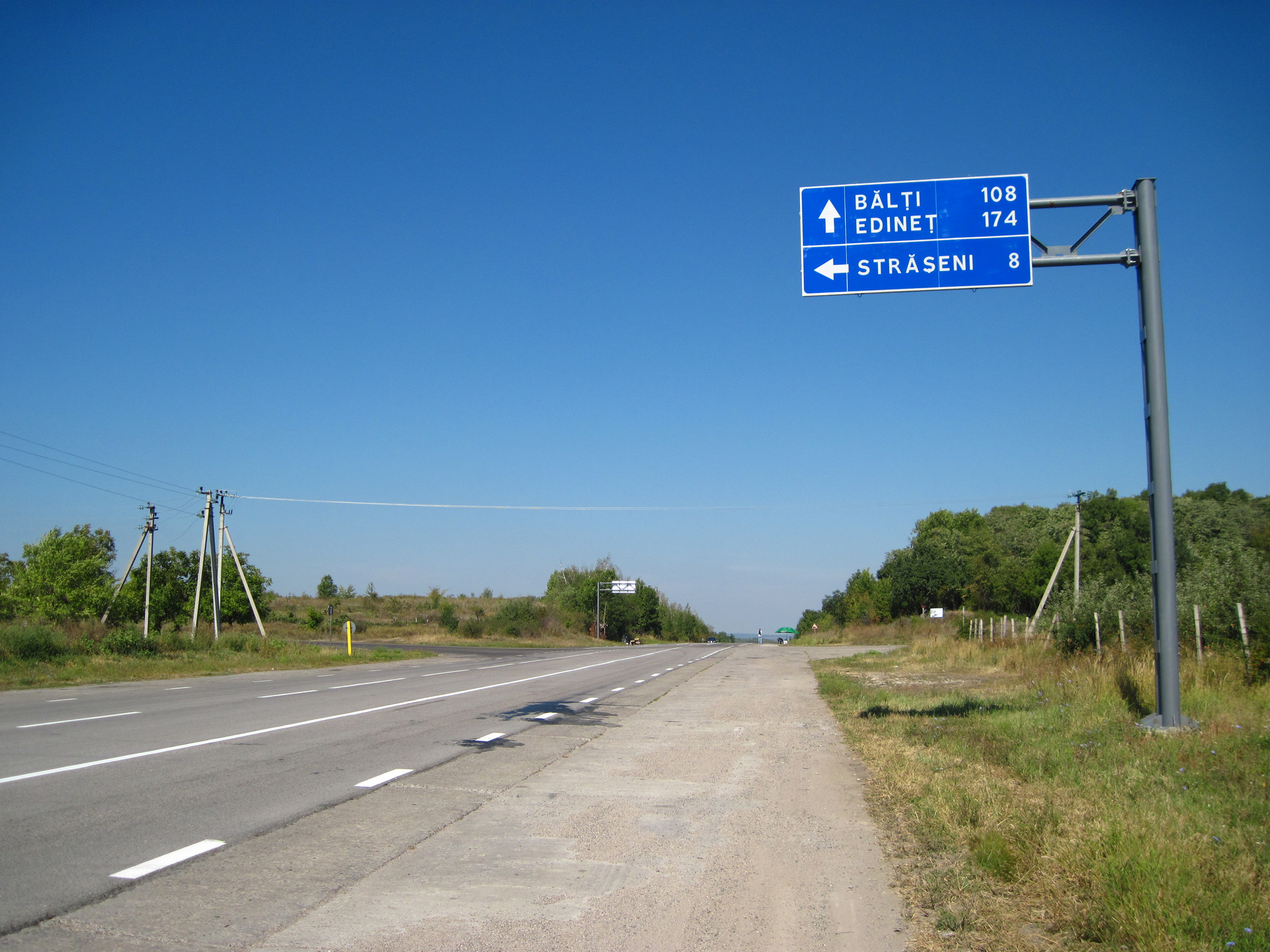
M5 highway near Strășeni

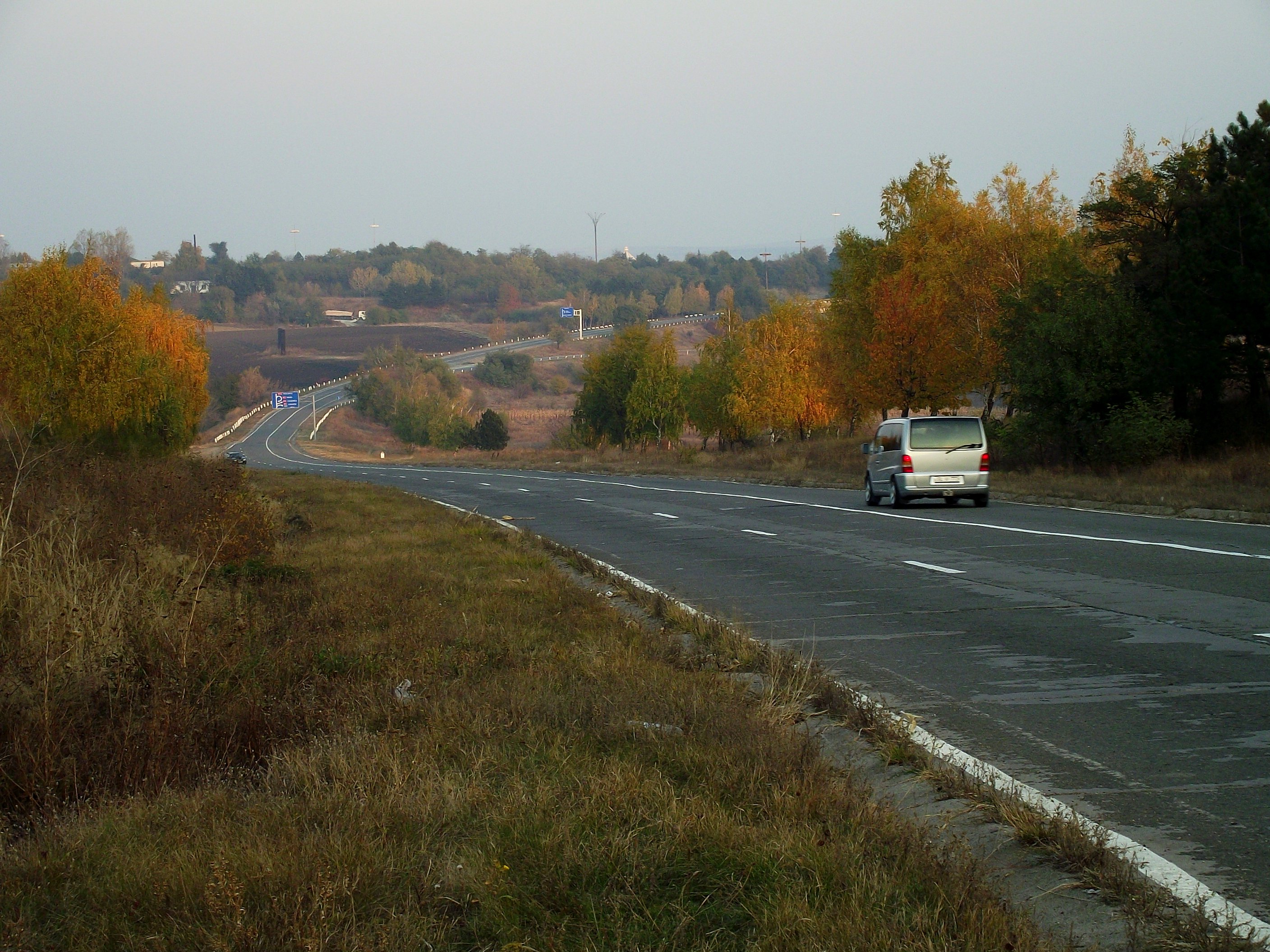
M5 highway at Grătiești

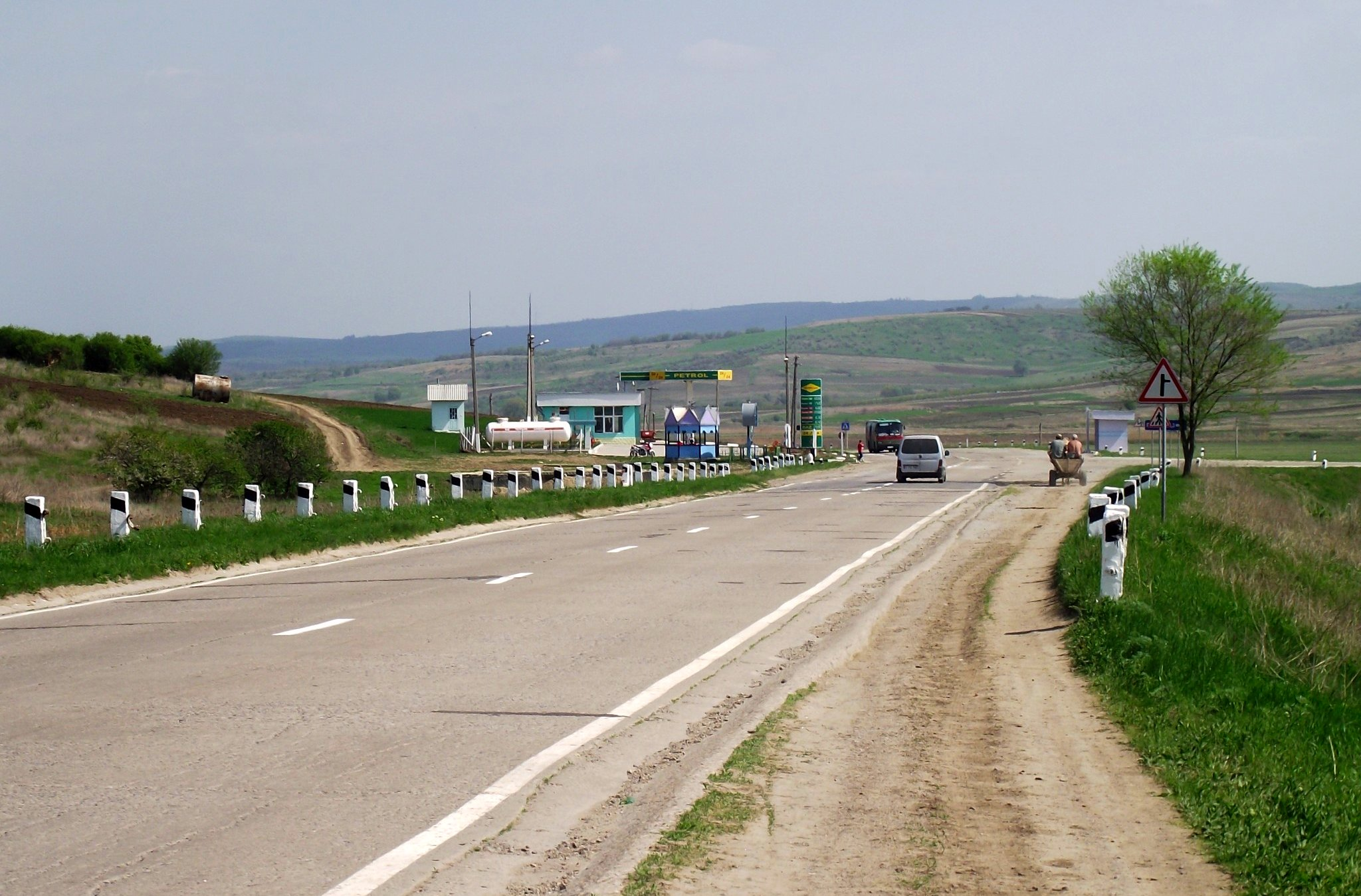
Gas station on the M5 highway, at an intersection with a local road

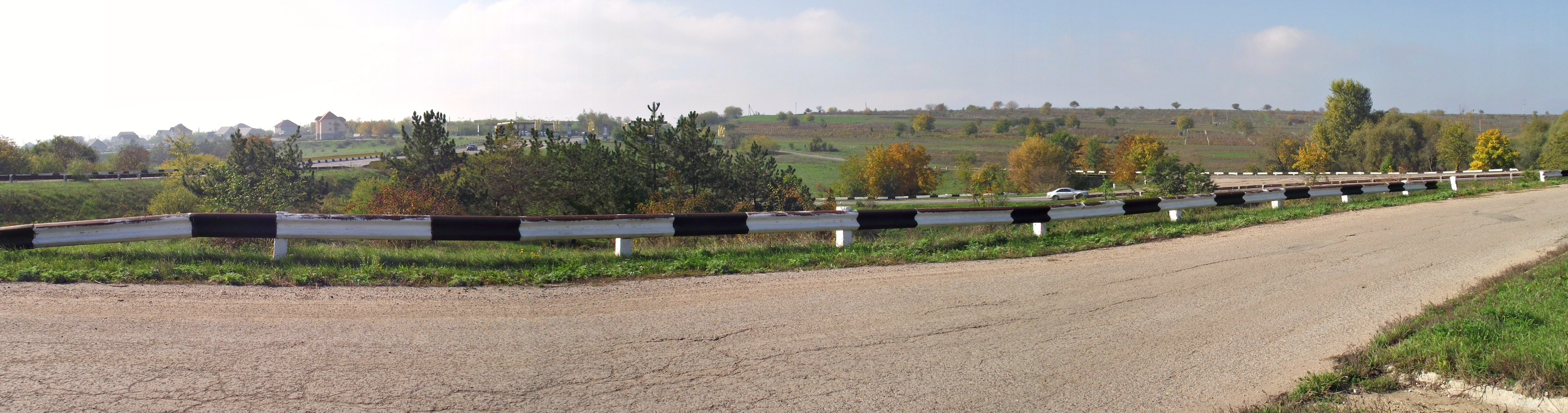
Junction on the M5 highway with republican road R5

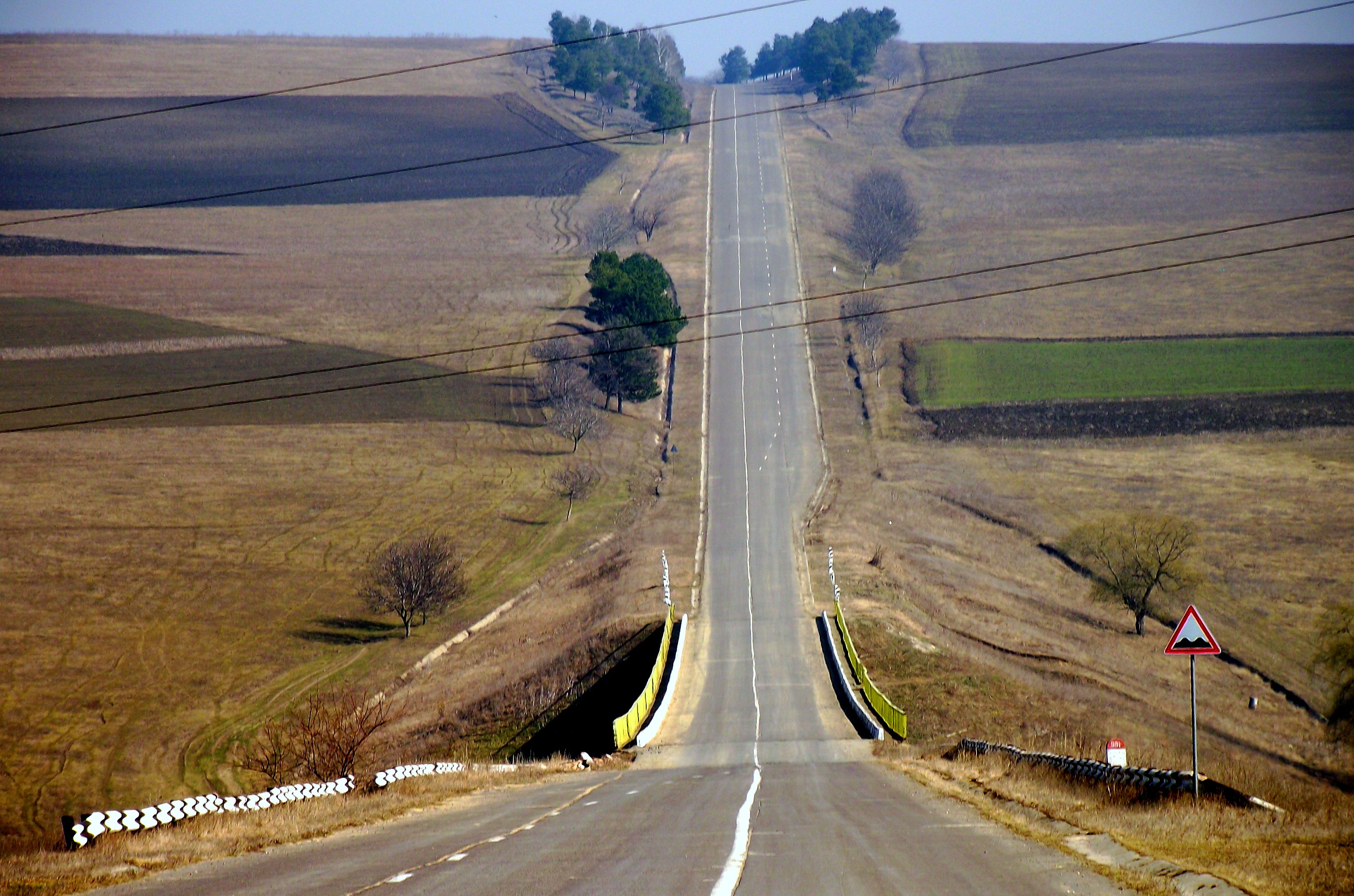
M5 highway between Chișinău and the unrecognized state of Transnistria
