= Leușeni, Telenești =

Leușeni
- Village
- Location within Moldova
- Coordinates: 47.4816666667°N 28.4322222222°E
- Country: Moldova
- District: Telenești District

Government
  - Mayor: Anatolie Pasat (PDM)

Population (2014 census)
  - Total: 1,740
- Time zone: UTC+2 (EET)
  - Summer (DST): UTC+3 (EEST)

Leușeni is a village in Telenești District, Moldova.
