= Pîrjota =

- Village
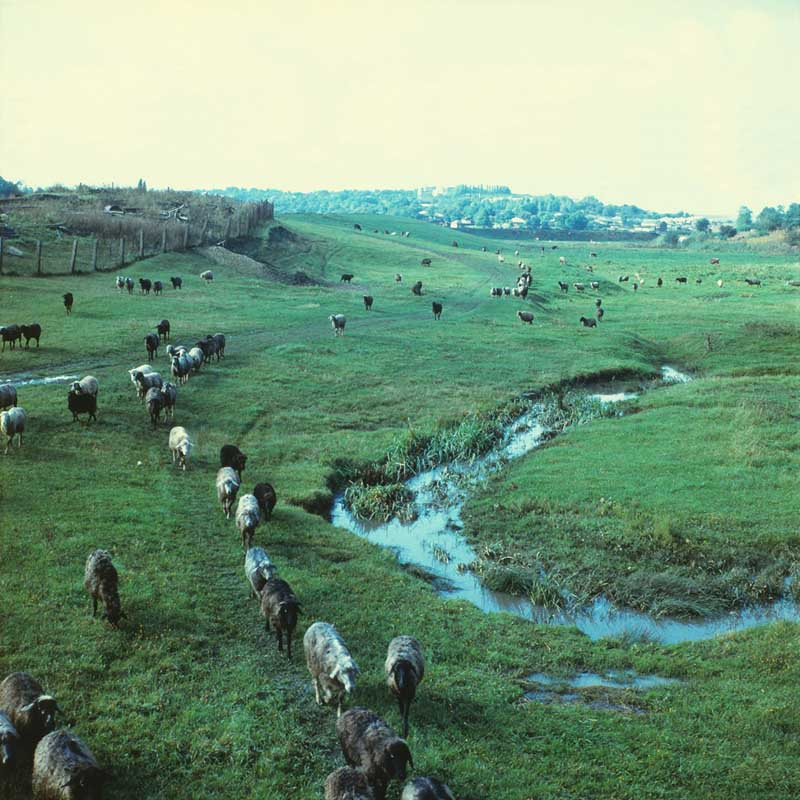

- Location within Moldova
- Coordinates: 47.95°N 27.4333333333°E
- Country: Moldova
- District: Rîșcani

Government
  - Mayor: Victor Garbuz (PDM)

Population (2014 census)
  - Total: 1,553
- Time zone: UTC+2 (EET)
  - Summer (DST): UTC+3 (EEST)

Pîrjota is a village in Rîșcani District, Moldova.
