= European route E583 =

Road in trans-European E-road network

E583

Route information
- Length: 628 km (390 mi)

Major junctions
- From: Săbăoani
- Iași; Bălți; Mohyliv-Podilskyi; Vinnytsia
- To: Zhytomyr

Location
- Countries: Romania; Moldova; Ukraine

Highway system
- International E-road network; A Class; B Class

European route E 583 is a European B-class road connecting the city of Săbăoani in Romania with Zhytomyr in Ukraine, via Moldova.

== Route ==
- Romania
  - DN2: Roman (E85) – Săbăoani
  - DN28: Săbăoani – Târgu Frumos (Start of concurrency with E58) – Iași
  - DN24: Iași – Sculeni
- Moldova
  - R 16: Sculeni (End of concurrency with E58) – Răuțel
  - M 5: Răuțel – Bălți – Edineț
  - R 8: Edineț – Otaci
- Ukraine
  - M 21: Mohyliv-Podilskyi – Vinnytsia (E50) – Berdychiv – Zhytomyr (E40)
