= Highway M13 (Ukraine) =

Highway in Ukraine

Highway M13
- Автошлях М13
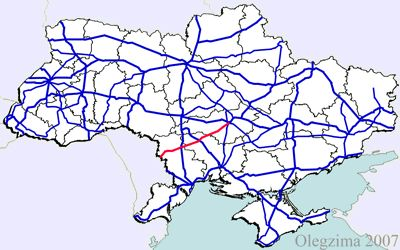

Route information
- Part of E584
- Length: 254.4 km (158.1 mi)

Major junctions
- East end: M 30 in Kropyvnytskyi
- M 05 in Liubashivka
- West end: Moldovan border in Platonove

Location
- Country: Ukraine
- Oblasts: Odesa, Mykolaiv, Kirovohrad

Highway system
- Roads in Ukraine; State Highways

M13 is a Ukrainian international highway (M-highway) connecting Kropyvnytskyi to the border with Moldova, where before crossing the Dniester it heads towards Chişinău as the M1. The entire route is part of European route E584.

== Main Route ==
Main route and connections to/intersections with other highways in Ukraine.

Marker	Main settlements	Notes	Highway Interchanges
0 km/0 mi	Kropyvnytskyi		E50/ E471 M 30 • H 14 • H 23
	Liubashivka		E95 M 05
254 km/158 mi	Platonove / Border (Moldova)		E584M1 (Moldova) (Transnistria)

Note

Technically the route crosses Transnistria.

== See also ==
- Roads in Ukraine
- Ukraine Highways
- International E-road network
- Pan-European corridors
