= Porumbrei =

- Interactive map of Porumbrei
- Coordinates: 46.6919444444°N 0°E
- Country: Moldova
- District: Cimișlia District

Porumbrei is a commune in Cimișlia District, Moldova.
