= Codrul Nou =

- Village
- Location within Moldova
- Coordinates: 47.5472222222°N 28.5777777778°E
- Country: Moldova
- District: Telenești District

Government
  - Mayor / Primar: Ion Albu (PAS)

Population (2014 census)
  - Total: 627
- Time zone: UTC+2 (EET)
  - Summer (DST): UTC+3 (EEST)
- Postal code: MD-5834

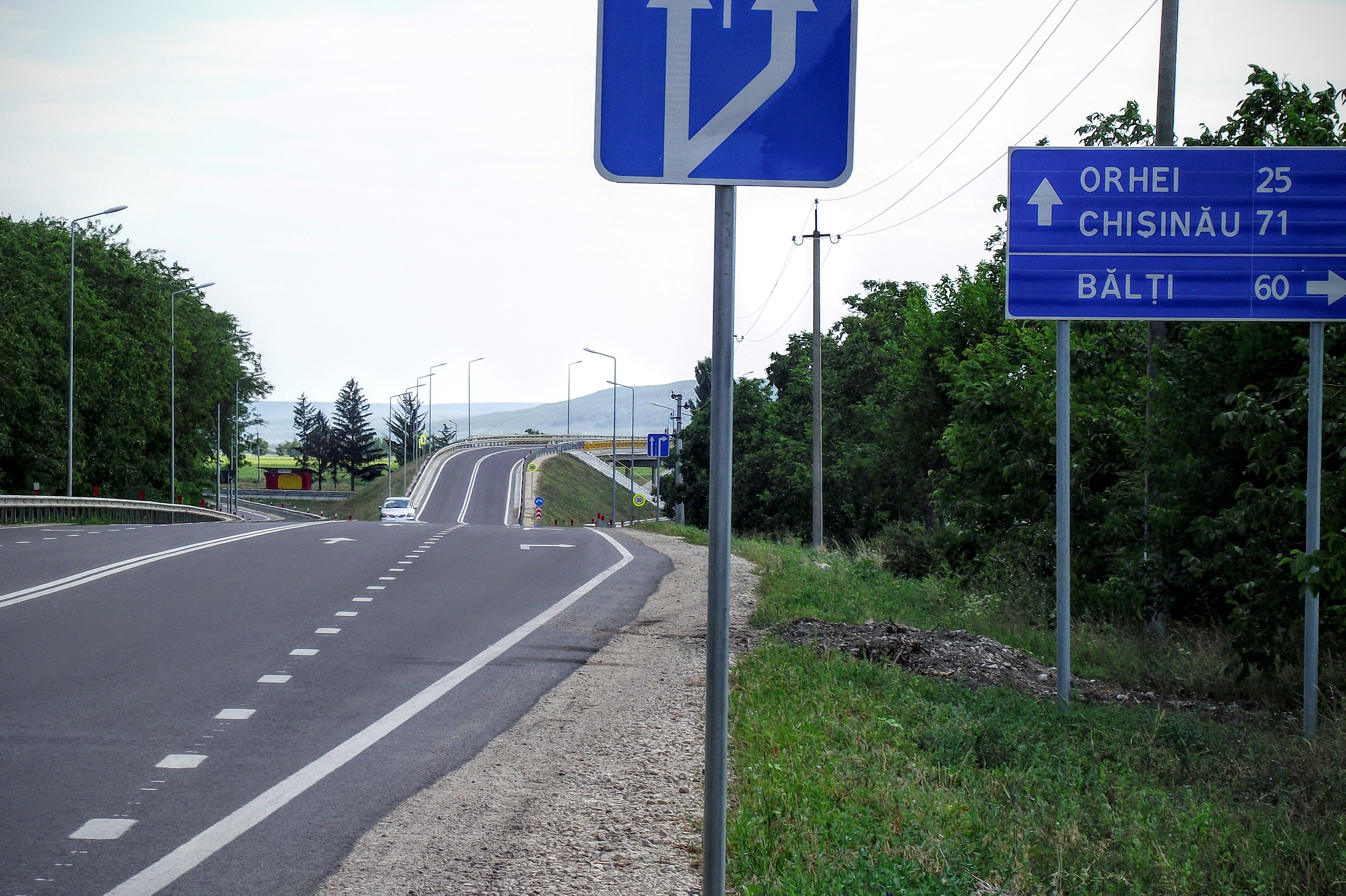
Telenești District, Moldova

Codrul Nou is a village in Telenești District, Moldova.

The village of Codrul Nou was established in 1925. The town is located between the Răut and Sagala rivers, near the highway coming from Chisinau through Orhei. According to the 2004 census data, the village population was 698 people, of which 50.72% - men and 49.28% - women. Ethnic population structure in the village: 96.99% - Moldovans (Romanians), 2.01% - Ukrainians, 0.72% - Russians, 0.29% - other ethnicities.

In the village of Codrul Nou, 214 households were registered at the 2004 census, and the average size of a household was 3.3 persons.

At the local elections in 2019, the people of Codru Nou village confirmed, by their vote for the representative of the Party for Action and Solidarity (PAS) - Mr. Ion Albu, their aspirations for a functional Democracy, for a Fair Justice and the pro-European Vector.

Now, the administration of the village Codru Nou is open and predisposed for International Collaborates in Agriculture, Social Services and others.
