= Sărata Nouă =

Sărata Nouă Neu-Sarata
- Commune
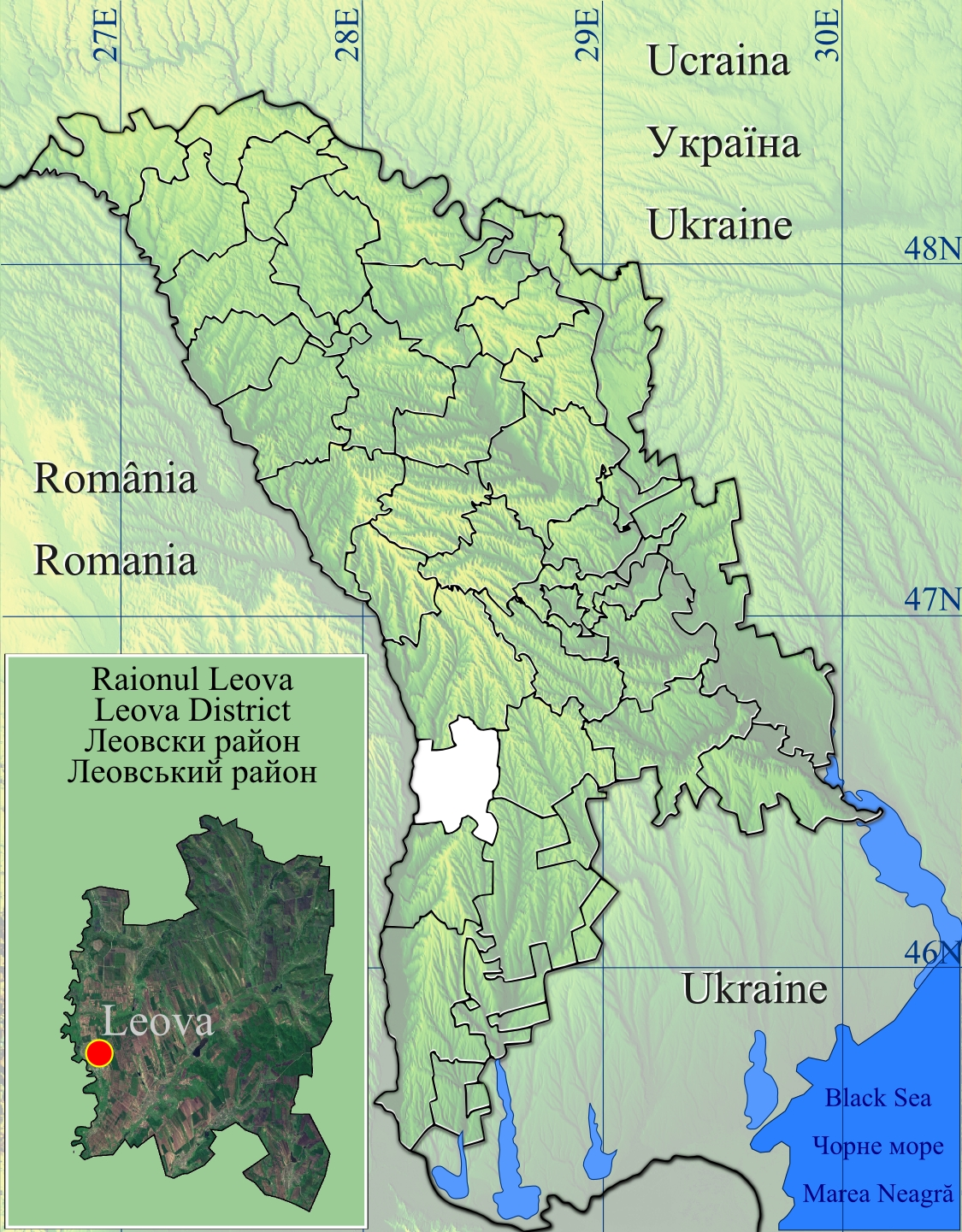
- Location within Moldova Leova
- Coordinates: 46°29′20″N 28°23′33″E
- Country: Moldova
- District: Leova District

Government
  - Mayor: Tatiana Gorgos (PLDM)
- Elevation: 62 m (203 ft)

Population (2014 census)
  - Total: 1,592
- Time zone: UTC+2 (EET)
  - Summer (DST): UTC+3 (EEST)
- Postal code: MD-6324

Sărata Nouă is a commune in Leova District, Moldova. It is composed of two villages: Sărata Nouă and Bulgărica.
