= Figa, Slovakia =

Village and municipality in Slovakia

Figa Gömörfüge
- Municipality
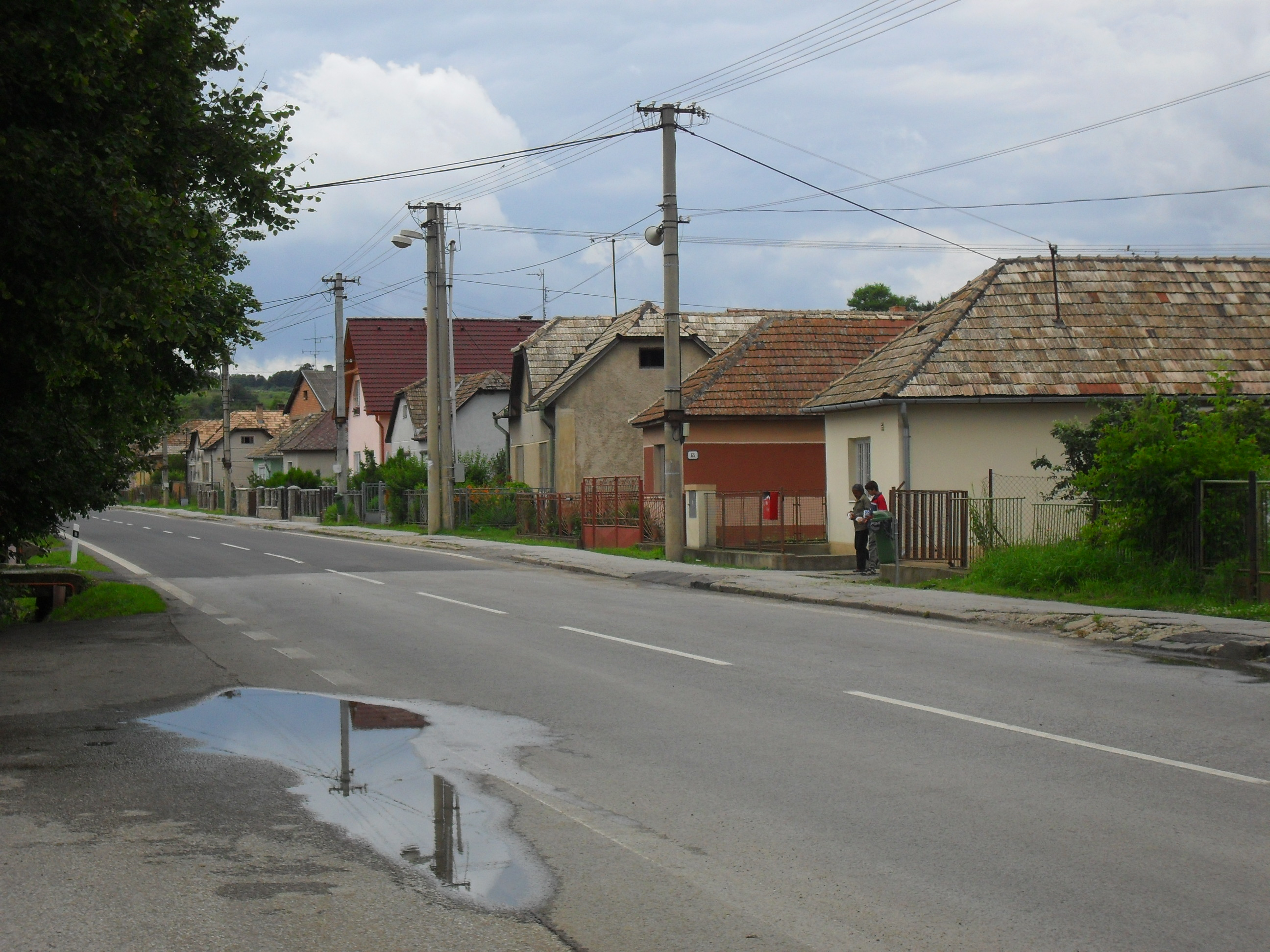

- Flag

- Location of Figa in the Banská Bystrica Region Location of Figa in Slovakia
- Coordinates: 48°24′N 20°15′E
- Country: Slovakia
- Region: Banská Bystrica Region
- District: Rimavská Sobota District
- First mentioned: 1294

Area
  - Total: 9.20 km^{2} (3.55 sq mi)
- Elevation: 181 m (594 ft)

Population (2025)
  - Total: 422
- Time zone: UTC+1 (CET)
  - Summer (DST): UTC+2 (CEST)
- Postal code: 982 51
- Area code: +421 47
- Vehicle registration plate (until 2022): RS
- Website: www.obecfiga.sk

Figa (Hungarian: Gömörfüge) is a village and municipality in Banská Bystrica Region of southern Slovakia.

== Geography ==
The municipality lies at an altitude of 181 metres (594 ft) and covers an area of 9.20 km^{2} (3.55 sq mi) (2025).

== History ==
In historical records, the village was first mentioned in 1294 (1294 Fygey, 1409 Felsewfygey).

== Population ==
Population statistic (10 years)
Year	1995	2005	2015	2025
Count	376	404	439	422
Difference		+7.44%	+8.66%	−3.87%

Population statistic
Year	2024	2025
Count	421	422
Difference		+0.23%

It has a population of 422 people (31 December 2025).

=== Ethnicity ===
Census 2021 (1+ %)
Ethnicity	Number	Fraction
Slovak	209	47.28%
Hungarian	188	42.53%
Romani	99	22.39%
Not found out	28	6.33%
Total	442	

In year 2021 was 442 people by ethnicity 209 as Slovak, 188 as Hungarian, 99 as Romani, 28 as Not found out and 1 as Czech.

Note on population: The difference values of population numbers in the table "Population statistic" and in the sections "Ethnicity" & "Religion" is caused by the use of various statistical methods.

=== Religion ===
Census 2021 (1+ %)
Religion	Number	Fraction
Roman Catholic Church	209	47.29%
None	179	40.5%
Not found out	23	5.2%
Calvinist Church	15	3.39%
Jehovah's Witnesses	8	1.81%
Evangelical Church	6	1.36%
Total	442	

In year 2021 was 442 people by religion 209 from Roman Catholic Church, 179 from None, 23 from Not found out, 15 from Calvinist Church, 8 from Jehovah's Witnesses, 6 from Evangelical Church, 1 from Christian Congregations in Slovakia and 1 from United Methodist Church.

== Genealogical resources ==
The records for genealogical research are available at the state archive "Statny Archiv in Banska Bystrica, Slovakia"

- Roman Catholic church records (births/marriages/deaths): 1789-1896 (parish B)
- Lutheran church records (births/marriages/deaths): 1730-1895 (parish B)
- Reformated church records (births/marriages/deaths): 1786-1903 (parish B)

== See also ==
- List of municipalities and towns in Slovakia
