= Chetrosu, Anenii Noi =

Chetrosu
- Commune
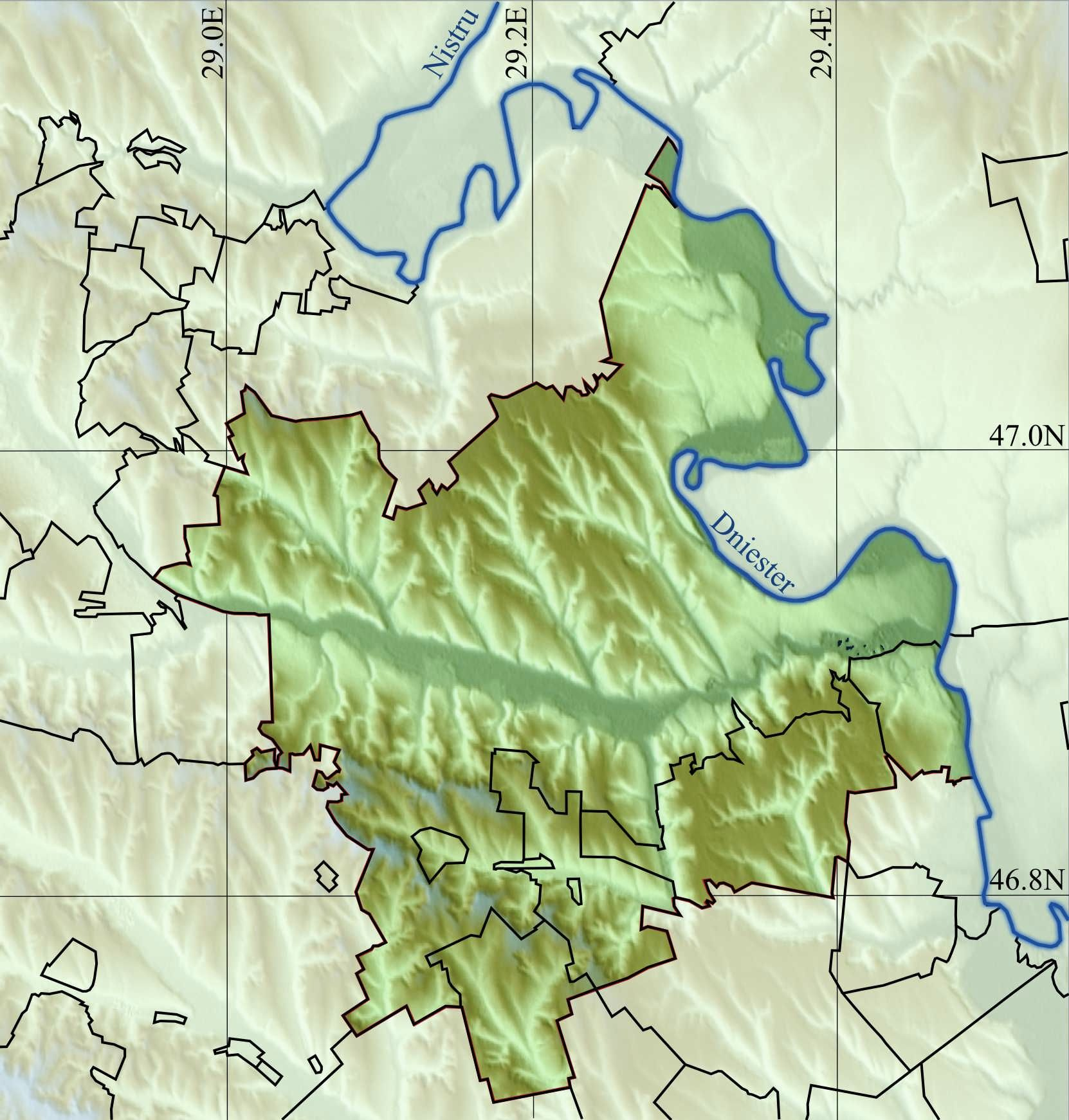
- Location within Anenii Noi District Location within Moldova
- Coordinates: 46°55′00″N 29°09′00″E
- Country: Moldova
- District: Anenii Noi District

Population (2014)
  - Total: 3,873
- Time zone: UTC+2 (EET)
  - Summer (DST): UTC+3 (EEST)
- Postal code: MD-6514

Chetrosu is a commune in the Anenii Noi District of the Republic of Moldova. It is composed of two villages, Chetrosu and Todirești.
