= European route E584 =

Road in trans-European E-road network

E584

Route information
- Length: 938 km (583 mi)

Major junctions
- From: Poltava
- Oleksandriia, Okny, Kropyvnytskyi, Chișinău, Giurgiulești, Galați
- To: Slobozia

Location
- Countries: Ukraine, Moldova, Romania

Highway system
- International E-road network; A Class; B Class

European route E 584 is a European B class road in Romania, Moldova and Ukraine, connecting the cities Poltava and Slobozia, Romania. This route was previously numbered as E577.

== Route ==
- Ukraine
  - M 22: Poltava (E85) - Oleksandriia
  - M 30: Oleksandriia - Znamianka - Kropyvnytskyi
  - M 13: Kropyvnytskyi (E50/E471) - Platonove
- Moldova
  - M 21: Dubău - Chișinău
  - M 3: Chișinău - Giurgiulești
- (European Union) Romania
  - DN2B: Galați - Brălia (concurrent with E87)
  - DN21: Brălia - Slobozia
