= Zăicana =

- Village
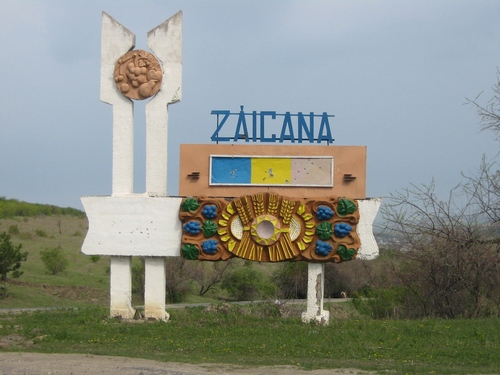

- Location within Moldova
- Coordinates: 47.1686111111°N 28.9519444444°E
- Country: Moldova
- District: Criuleni

Government
  - Primar: Croitor Cornel (PAS)

Population (2014 census)
  - Total: 1,792
- Time zone: UTC+2 (EET)
  - Summer (DST): UTC+3 (EEST)

Zăicana is a village in Criuleni District, Moldova.
