= Leușeni, Hîncești =

Leușeni
- Commune
- Location in Moldova
- Coordinates: 46°48′33″N 28°11′58″E
- Country: Moldova
- District: Cantemir District

Population (2014)
  - Total: 2,046
- Time zone: UTC+2 (EET)
  - Summer (DST): UTC+3 (EEST)

Leușeni is a commune in Hîncești District, Moldova. It is composed of two villages, Feteasca and Leușeni.

It is also a border crossing point between Moldova and Romania.
