= Dubău =

Dubău Дубово (Russian) Ду́бове (Ukrainian)
- Commune
- Location within Moldova
- Coordinates: 47°25′44″N 29°16′47″E
- Country (de jure): Moldova
- Country (de facto): Transnistria (Note: Transnistria's political status is disputed. It considers itself to be an independent state, but this is not recognised by any UN member state. The Moldovan government and the international community consider Transnistria a part of Moldova's territory.)
- Elevation: 69 m (226 ft)
- Time zone: UTC+2 (EET)
  - Summer (DST): UTC+3 (EEST)

Dubău (Moldovan Cyrillic: Дубэу, Russian: Дубoвo, romanized: Dubovo, Ukrainian: Дубове, romanized: Dubove) is a commune in the Dubăsari District of Transnistria, Moldova. It is composed of two villages, Dubău and Goianul Nou (Нові Гояни, Новые Гояны). Since 1990, it has been administered as a part of the breakaway Pridnestrovian Moldavian Republic. In 2004, the commune had 724 inhabitants, of which 675 were Moldovans (93.23%), 31 were Ukrainians (4.28%) and 16 were Russians (2.21%).

== History ==
Dubowa, as it was known in Polish, was a private village of the Lubomirski family, administratively located in the Bracław County in the Bracław Voivodeship in the Lesser Poland Province of the Kingdom of Poland. Following the Second Partition of Poland, it was annexed by Russia.

In 1924, it became part of the Moldavian Autonomous Oblast, which was soon converted into the Moldavian Autonomous Soviet Socialist Republic, and the Moldavian Soviet Socialist Republic in 1940 during World War II. From 1941 to 1944, it was administered by Romania as part of the Transnistria Governorate.
