= Pervomaisc, Transnistria =

Pervomaisc Первомайск (Russian) Первома́йськ (Ukrainian)
- Village
- Location within Moldova
- Coordinates: 46°43′59″N 29°57′30″E
- Country (de jure): Moldova
- Country (de facto): Transnistria (Note: Transnistria's political status is disputed. It considers itself to be an independent state, but this is not recognised by any UN member state. The Moldovan government and the international community consider Transnistria a part of Moldova's territory.)
- Elevation: 40 m (130 ft)
- Time zone: UTC+2 (EET)
  - Summer (DST): UTC+3 (EEST)

Pervomaisc (Moldovan Cyrillic and Russian: Первомайск, romanized: Pervomaysk, Ukrainian: Первомайськ, romanized: Pervomays'k) is an urban-type settlement (according to Transnistrian legislation) or village (according to Moldovan legislation) in the Slobozia District of Transnistria, Moldova. Since 1990, It has been administered as a part of the breakaway Transnistrian Moldovan Republic.

According to the 2004 census, the population of the village was 4,434 inhabitants, of which 750 (16.91%) were Moldovans (Romanians), 2,068 (46.63%) Ukrainians and 1,408 (31.75%) Russians.
