= Transport in Moldova =

In 1995, the main means of transportation in Moldova were railways (1,138 km or 707 mi) and a highway system (12,730 km or 7,910 mi overall, including 10,973 km or 6,818 mi of paved surfaces). The major railway junctions are Chișinău, Bender, Ungheni, Ocnița, Bălți, and Basarabeasca. Primary external rail links connect the republic's network with Odesa (in Ukraine) on the Black Sea and with the Romanian cities of Iași and Galați; they also lead northward into Ukraine. Highways link Moldova's main cities and provide the chief means of transportation within the country, but roads are in poor repair. The country's major airport is in Chișinău.

Shipping is possible on the lower Prut and Nistru rivers, but water transportation plays only a modest role in the country's transportation system. In 1990 a total of 317 million tonkilometers of freight were carried on inland waterways as compared with 15,007 million ton-kilometers on railways and 1,673 million ton-kilometers on roads.

The movement of manufactured goods and of passengers on all means of transportation started to decline in 1989. From 1993 to 1994, for example, the total amount of transported goods fell by 31 percent, passenger traffic decreased by 28 percent, and the number of passengers declined by 24 percent. The main causes for these declines are the high cost of transportation, a lack of fuels, and the poor state of Moldova's transportation infrastructure: approximately 20 percent of Moldova's roads are considered in a critical technical state.

== Railways ==
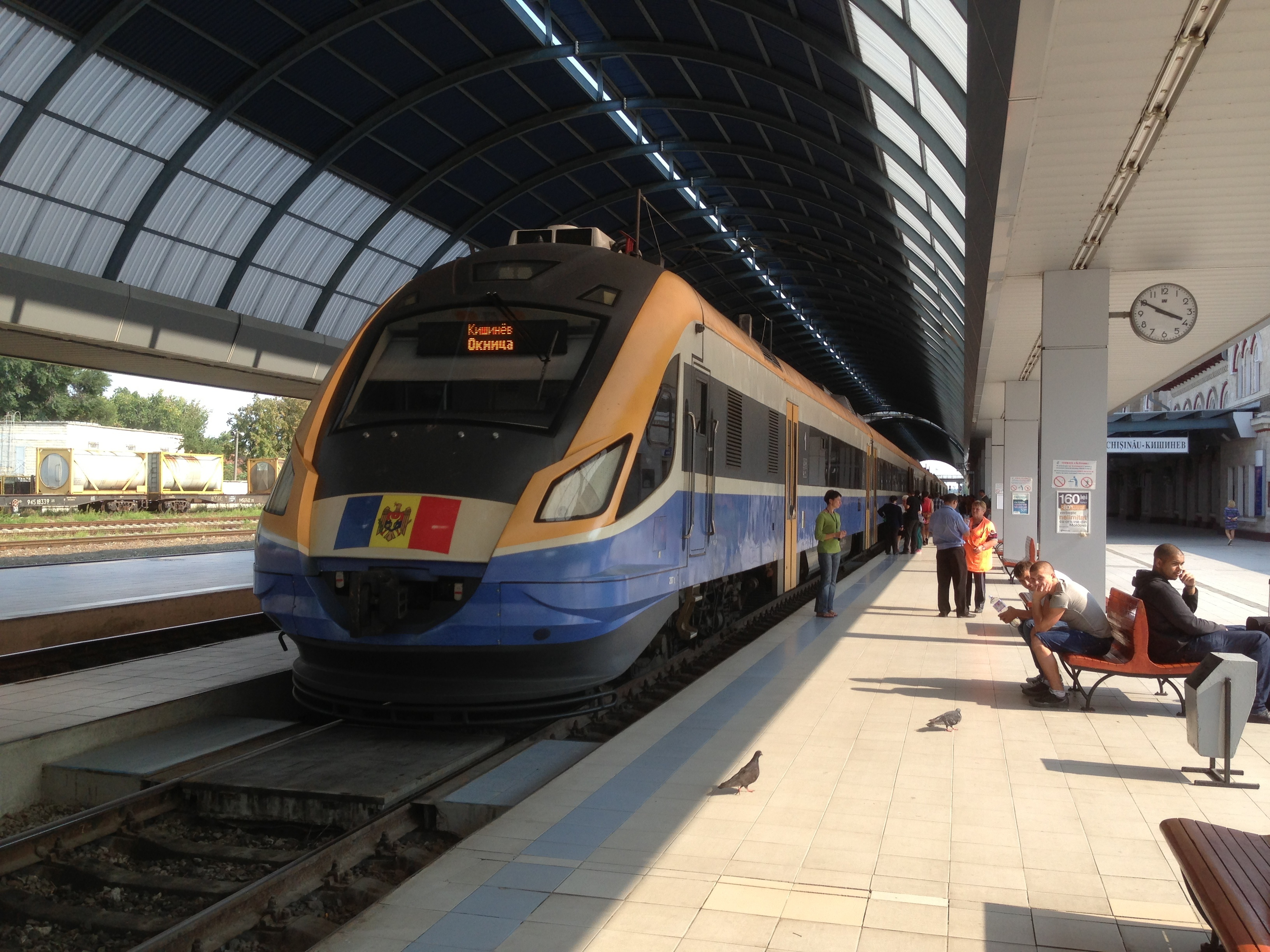
New trains of Moldova

total: 1,138 km (707 mi)
broad gauge: 1,124 km (698 mi) of 1,520 mm (4 ft 11 27/32 in) gauge (2005) The entire length of the Moldovan railway network is single track and not electrified. Much of the railway infrastructure is still in a poor state, all of the rolling stock having been inherited from the former Soviet Union. Average commercial speed for passenger trains is 35–40 km/h (22–25 mph) (including stops). However, substantial investments have been made in building new railway lines since 2003, with the goal of connecting Chișinău to southern Moldova and eventually to the Giurgiulești oil terminal. The first such segment was the 40 km (25 mi) Revaca–Căinari line, opened in 2006.

Connections exist to Ukraine at Kuchurhan, Mohilyv-Podil's'ky, Ocnița. The track between Basarabeasca and Reni crosses the border back and forth. The Kuchurhan crossing as well as the Tighina–Tiraspol–Kuchurhan segment are under the control of the Transnistrian separatist authorities, the circulation of trains on the route depending on the level of political tensions between the separatists and the Government of Moldova.

Between Moldova and Romania there is a break-of-gauge (Romania employing standard gauge). The most important crossing (including gauge changing equipment) is Ungheni–Iași, another two are Cantemir–Fălciu and Giurgiulești–Galați. International passenger trains run to Bucharest, Kyiv, Minsk and used to travel to Saint Petersburg and Moscow.

In 2022/23 major investment, supported by the EU, is being undertaken to renovate rail lines to provide freight facilities for Ukraine to connect with Constanța to export grain and import fuel.

The EU proposed in 2023 that their Trans-European Transport Network (TEN-T) be extended to Moldova and onwards to Ukraine with a standard gauge (1435mm) rail line, to assist in the integration of Moldova with EU rail networks. Starting with the Ungheni, on the border with Romania, to Chisinau, by laying a new line alongside the existing 1520mm track, to avoid disruption.

== Highways ==
A vehicle license plate in Moldova

Moldova requires use of vignettes (roviniete) on all public roads, inside and outside localities, as a form of road tolling for non-Moldovan vehicles.

total: 12,730 km (7,910 mi)
paved: 10,973 km (6,818 mi)
unpaved: 1,757 km (1,092 mi) (2003)

== Waterways ==
- 424 km or 263 mi (on the Dniester River) (2005). Parts fully under control of the separatist Transnistrian authorities.
- a tiny (400–650 m or 1,312–2,133 ft) access to the Danube at Giurgiulești.

== Pipelines ==
Natural gas 656 km (408 mi) (2021)

Moldova began importing gas from Romania in December 2022 through the Iași–Chișinău pipeline, connecting to the European energy system, began exporting gas to Ukraine in February 2023 and disconnected from Russia gas lines in May 2023.

== Ports and harbours ==
Moldova has one small oil terminal on the Danube at Giurgiulești (Cahul), compatible with small seagoing vessels. The harbor was opened in 2006 and occupies the entire Moldovan stretch of the river (less than 600 m or 1,969 ft), with a mixed-gauge rail loading/unloading facilities. Run by Danube Logistics, which is owned by the European Bank for Reconstruction and Development.

== Merchant marine ==
Statistics for 2021:

- 147 ships with total 532,000 tonnes deadweight (DWT).
- 2,526 seafarers.

== Airports ==
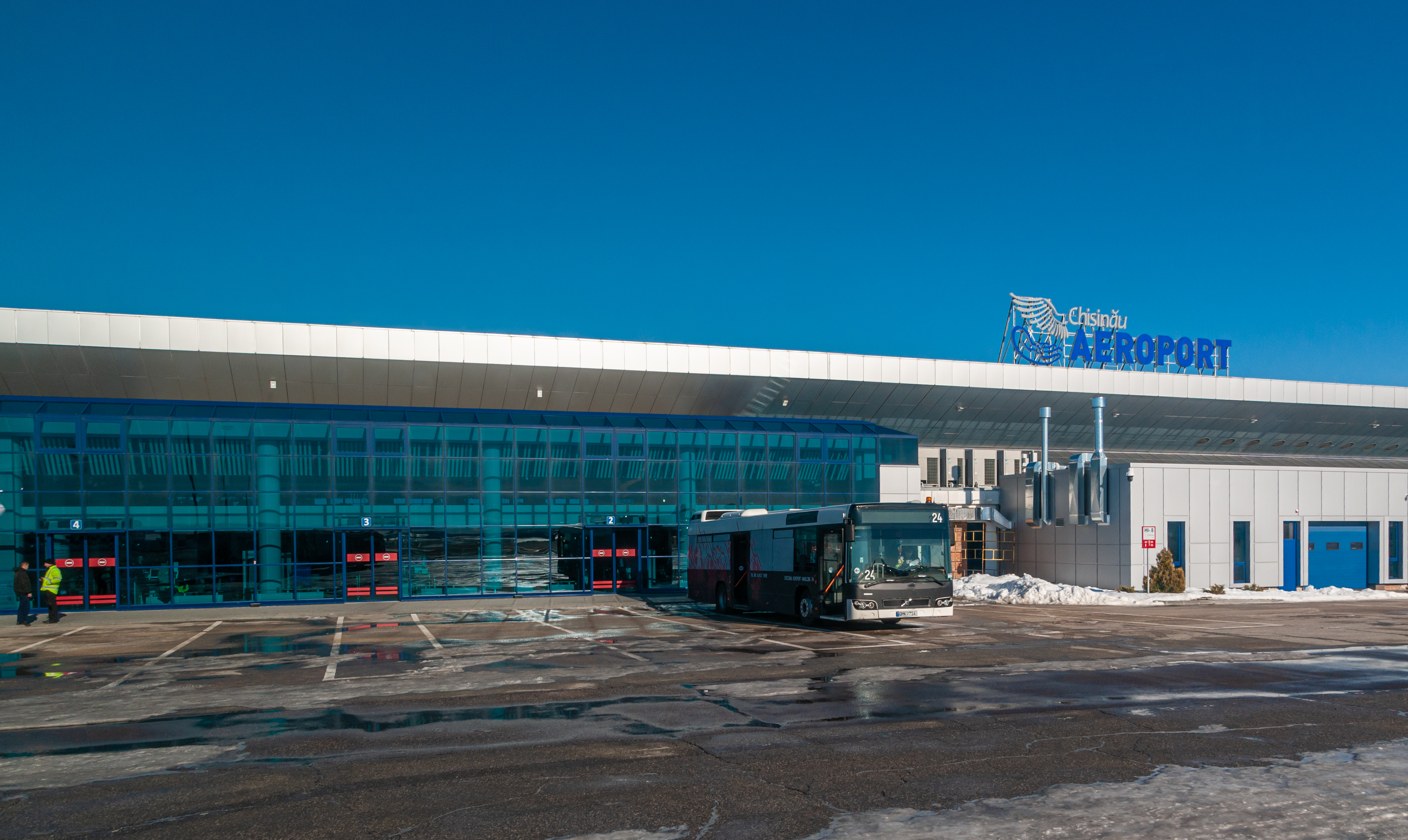
Chișinău Eugen Doga International Airport

3 operational airports (2021 est.). The main airport (Chișinău Eugen Doga International Airport) has over 10 busy international destinations (with 2.9 million passengers carried on 27,000 flights in 2019).

=== Airports - with paved runways ===
total: 6
over 3,047 m (9,997 ft): 1
2,438 to 3,047 m (7,999 to 9,997 ft): 2
1,524 to 2,437 m (5,000 to 7,995 ft): 2
under 914 m (2,999 ft): 1 (2006 est.)

=== Airports - with unpaved runways ===
total: 6
914 to 1,523 m (2,999 to 4,997 ft): 3
under 914 m (2,999 ft): 3 (2006 est.)
