= Moldova–Ukraine border =

International border in Eastern Europe

The Moldova–Ukraine border, the official border between Republic of Moldova and Ukraine, was established after the dissolution of the Soviet Union. The length of the inland border is 1,222 kilometres (759 mi), of which 267 kilometres (166 mi) is fluvial (i.e., along rivers) and 955 kilometres (593 mi) is land border. About 454 kilometres (282 mi) of it constitutes the de facto border between Ukraine and the unrecognized breakaway republic of Transnistria.

The border runs from the northern Romania-Moldova-Ukraine tripoint in the northwest of the country, 4 kilometres (2.5 mi), from the Ukrainian village and border crossing of Mamalyha, Ukraine to Criva, Briceni, Moldova. It runs east until the city and border crossing of Mohyliv-Podilskyi, where it turns southeast and enters the channel of the river of Dniester. By the village of Nimereuca the territory of Transnistria begins, which ends by Purcari. Several kilometers further it turns west. By Basarabeasca District it turns south and runs until the southern Romania-Moldova-Ukraine tripoint near Galați, Romania and Reni, Ukraine, by the Danube.

As of 2014 the border had 67 permanent official border crossings classified into three categories: international, for crossing by citizens of any state; interstate, for crossing only by citizens of Moldova and Ukraine; and local, for local border traffic. Of them, 25 crossings are along the territory held by the Transnistrian separatist regime and are not monitored by the Moldovan border guards. There is a unique situation with the Moldovan village of Palanca, Ștefan Vodă. European route E87, connecting Odesa and Bolhrad runs through a small stretch of Moldovan territory, turning the part of Ukraine west of Dniestr river into a de facto pene-exclave. The only way to reach Bolhrad without crossing the border is via the bridge on the spit over the Dniester Estuary near the town of Zatoka, part of highway H33.

In 2022, after the start of the Russo-Ukrainian war (2022–present), checkpoints along the breakaway republic of Transnistria were closed. The Ukrainian government officially said that the measure prevents a potential invasion from the southwest. The border was even fortified with landmines.

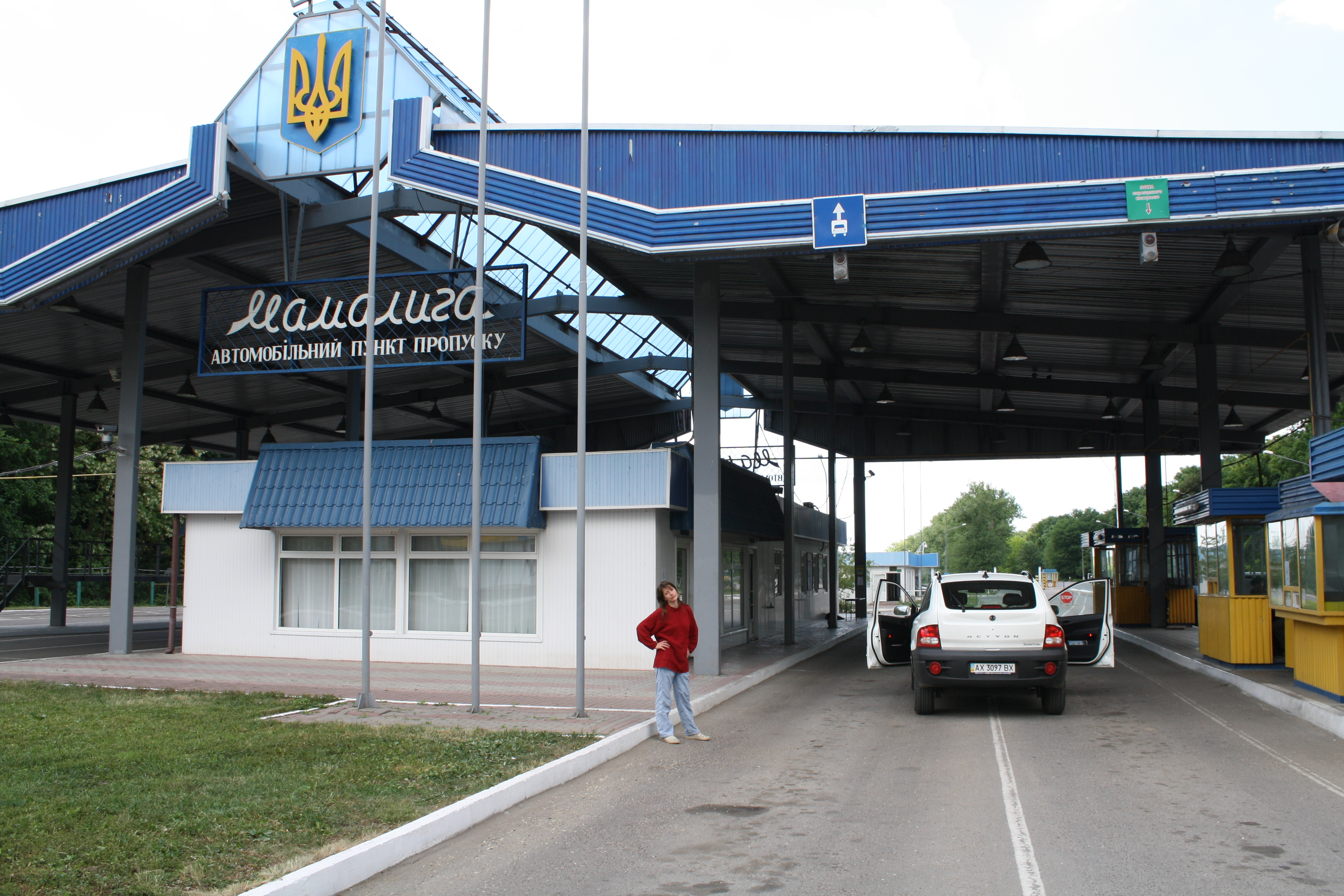
Checkpoint Mamalyha (Chernivtsi Oblast) in Northern Bessarabia

== List of border crossings with Moldova ==
There are currently 21 open road border crossings between Moldova and Ukraine and 2 additional crossings by ferry. The 20 crossings that lead to territory controlled by the unrecognized Pridnestrovian Moldavian Republic have been closed since the beginning of the Russo-Ukrainian war. The crossings are listed from North to South.

Moldovan name	Ukrainian name	Moldovan road	Ukrainian road	Status	Opening times
Criva	Mamalyha			international	24 hours
Lipcani	Podvirivka	local road	local road	international	24 hours
Medveja	Zelena	local road	local road	international	24 hours
Larga	Kelmentsi	local road	local road	international	24 hours
Briceni	Rososhany	R 55	P-133	international	24 hours
Grimăncăuți	Vashkivtsi	L-20	T-2633	international	24 hours
Clocușna	Sokyriany 1	local road	local road	local	24 hours
Ocnița	Sokyriany 2	R 11	P 63	international	24 hours
Otaci	Mohyliv-Podilskyi	R 8	M 21	international	24 hours
Unguri	Bronnytsia	R 14	P 9.1	international	24 hours
Cosăuți	Yampil	M 2 (ferry)	P 14.1 (ferry)	international	daytime
Soroca	Tsekynivka	local road (ferry)	local road (ferry)	bilateral	daytime
Hruşca	Velyka Kisnytsia	L-126	T-0215	bilateral	24 hours (CLOSED)
Ocnița	Hrabarivka	local road	local road	local	daytime (CLOSED)
Hristovaia	Bolhan	M 4	T-0225	international	24 hours (CLOSED)
Rotari	Studena	local road	T-0233	local	daytime (CLOSED)
Slobozia-Rașcov	Oleksiivka	local road	T-1611	bilateral	24 hours (CLOSED)
Vadul Turcului	Oleksiivka	local road	local road	local	daytime (CLOSED)
Broșteni	Tymkove	L-137	P 75	international	24 hours (CLOSED)
Cobasna	Domnytsya	local road	local road	local	daytime (CLOSED)
Vărăncău	Stanislavka	L-155	T-1638	international	24 hours (CLOSED)
Jura	Fedosiivka	local road	local road	local	daytime (CLOSED)
Dubău	Dubove	local road	local road	local	daytime (CLOSED)
Goianul Nou	Platonove	M 21	M 13	international	24 hours (CLOSED)
Colosova	Yosypivka	local road	T-1614	bilateral	24 hours (CLOSED)
Mocearovca	Pavlivka	local road	local road	local	daytime (CLOSED)
Mălăiești	Velykopoloske	local road	local road	bilateral	24 hours (CLOSED)
Blijnii Hutor	Slovyanoserbka	local road	local road	bilateral	24 hours (CLOSED)
Tiraspol	Hrebenyky	M 14	T-1616	local	24 hours (CLOSED)
Andriaşevca Nouă	Rozalivka	local road	local road	local	daytime (CLOSED)
Pervomaisc	Kuchurhan	M 5	M 16	international	24 hours (CLOSED)
Nezavertailovca	Hradenytsi	local road	local road	international	24 hours (CLOSED)
Palanca	Mayaky-Udobne	M 3	M 15	international	24 hours
Tudora	Starokozache	R 30	P 72	international	24 hours
Săiți	Lisne	R 31	T-1644	international	24 hours
Basarabeasca	Serpneve	R 49	T-1627	international	24 hours
Ceadîr-Lunga 1	Maloyaroslavets	R 31	T-1645	bilateral	24 hours
Ceadîr-Lunga 2	Novi Troyany	R 29	T-1632	international	24 hours
Cairaclia	Zaliznychne	L-666	local road	local	24 hours
Mirnoe	Tabaky	L-672	T-1629	international	24 hours
Vulcăneşti	Vynohradivka	adjacent to M 3	M 15	international	24 hours
Cișmichioi	Dolynske	L-705	T-1642	bilateral	24 hours
Giurgiulești	Reni	M 3	M 15	international	24 hours

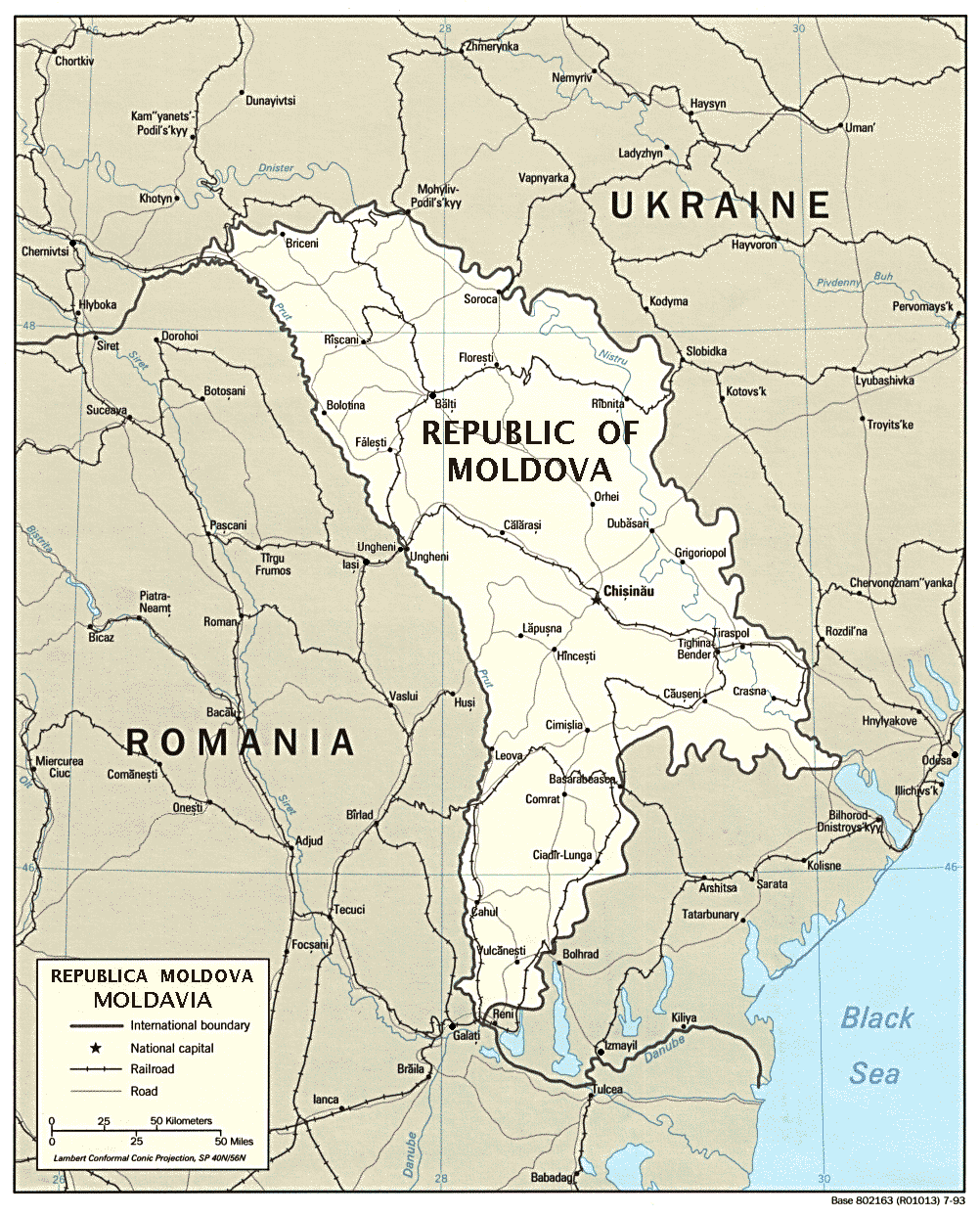
Map of Moldova

== Stateless persons crossing into Ukraine ==
Per the Ukraine Government's site as of 21 Sep 2017 "Foreigners and stateless persons enter Ukraine only when they have a passport and a certain type of visa, which is required by a current legislation or an international agreement, if there are no other requirements. Copies of passports, visas and other documents confirmed by a notary give no right to cross the state border."

== See also ==
- Transnistrian border customs issues
- Moldova–Ukraine relations
- European Union Border Assistance Mission to Moldova and Ukraine
