= Dubovoye =

Dubovoye may refer to several settlements in Russia:

- Dubovoye, Amur Oblast
- Dubovoye, Belgorod Oblast
- Dubovoye, Svetloyarsky District, Volgograd Oblast
- Dubovoye, Yelansky District, Volgograd Oblast

== See also ==
- Dubove (disambiguation), a list of similarly-named places in Ukraine
