= Zheleznodorozhny, Russia =

Zheleznodorozhny (Russian: Железнодорожный; masculine), Zheleznodorozhnaya (Железнодорожная; feminine), or Zheleznodorozhnoye (Железнодорожное; neuter), literally meaning "pertaining to rail transport", is the name of several inhabited localities in Russia.

== Modern localities ==
Urban localities

- Zheleznodorozhny, Ust-Ilimsky District, Irkutsk Oblast, a work settlement in Ust-Ilimsky District of Irkutsk Oblast
- Zheleznodorozhny, Kaliningrad Oblast, an urban-type settlement in Pravdinsky District of Kaliningrad Oblast

Rural localities

- Zheleznodorozhny, Arkhangelsk Oblast, a settlement under the administrative jurisdiction of Urdoma Urban-Type Settlement with Jurisdictional Territory in Lensky District of Arkhangelsk Oblast
- Zheleznodorozhny, Republic of Bashkortostan, a selo in Zheleznodorozhny Selsoviet of Beloretsky District in the Republic of Bashkortostan
- Zheleznodorozhny, Usolsky District, Irkutsk Oblast, a settlement in Usolsky District of Irkutsk Oblast
- Zheleznodorozhny, Ivanovo Oblast, a selo in Ivanovsky District of Ivanovo Oblast
- Zheleznodorozhny, Kaluga Oblast, a railway crossing loop in Khvastovichsky District of Kaluga Oblast
- Zheleznodorozhny, Kursk Oblast, a settlement in Snizhansky Selsoviet of Dmitriyevsky District in Kursk Oblast
- Zheleznodorozhny, Podolsky District, Moscow Oblast, a settlement in Lagovskoye Rural Settlement of Podolsky District in Moscow Oblast; 55°23′N 37°32′E
- Zheleznodorozhny, Nizhny Novgorod Oblast, a settlement in Sitnikovsky Selsoviet under the administrative jurisdiction of the town of oblast significance of Bor in Nizhny Novgorod Oblast; 56°28′N 44°3′E
- Zheleznodorozhny, Novosibirsk Oblast, a settlement in Novosibirsky District of Novosibirsk Oblast; 54°59′N 83°17′E
- Zheleznodorozhny, Perm Krai, a settlement in Usolsky District of Perm Krai
- Zheleznodorozhny, Rostov Oblast, a khutor in Markinskoye Rural Settlement of Tsimlyansky District in Rostov Oblast; 47°56′N 41°59′E
- Zheleznodorozhny, Smolensk Oblast, a village in Vyazma-Bryanskoye Rural Settlement of Vyazemsky District in Smolensk Oblast
- Zheleznodorozhny, Stavropol Krai, a settlement in Soldato-Alexsandrovsky Selsoviet of Sovetsky District in Stavropol Krai
- Zheleznodorozhny, Tula Oblast, a settlement in Revyakinskaya Rural Territory of Yasnogorsky District in Tula Oblast
- Zheleznodorozhny, Volgograd Oblast, a settlement in Shurupovsky Selsoviet of Frolovsky District in Volgograd Oblast
- Zheleznodorozhnoye, Republic of Crimea, a selo in Bakhchisaraysky District of the Republic of Crimea
- Zheleznodorozhnoye, Kaliningrad Oblast, a settlement in Dobrovolsky Rural Okrug of Krasnoznamensky District in Kaliningrad Oblast

== Historical localities ==
- Zheleznodorozhny, Moscow Oblast, a former city under the oblast jurisdiction in Moscow Oblast; since 2015—a part of the city of Balashikha 55°45′N 38°1′E
- Zheleznodorozhny, a former urban-type settlement in Chelyabinsk Oblast; since 2004—a part of the town of Kopeysk

== Historical names ==
- Zheleznodorozhny, in 1941–1985, the name of Yemva, a town in Knyazhpogostsky District of the Komi Republic; 62°36′N 50°52′E
