= Zaliznychne =

Zaliznychne (Ukrainian: Залізничне) is a Ukrainian placename, meaning 'railway'. It can refer to the following places in Ukraine:

- Zaliznychne, Dnipropetrovsk Oblast
- Zaliznychne, Vinnytsia Oblast
- Zaliznychne, Zaporizhzhia Oblast

== See also ==
- Zheleznodorozhny (disambiguation), a list of places with the equivalent Russian-language name
- Zaliznychnyi District (disambiguation)
