= Palanca, Ștefan Vodă =

Palanca
- Village
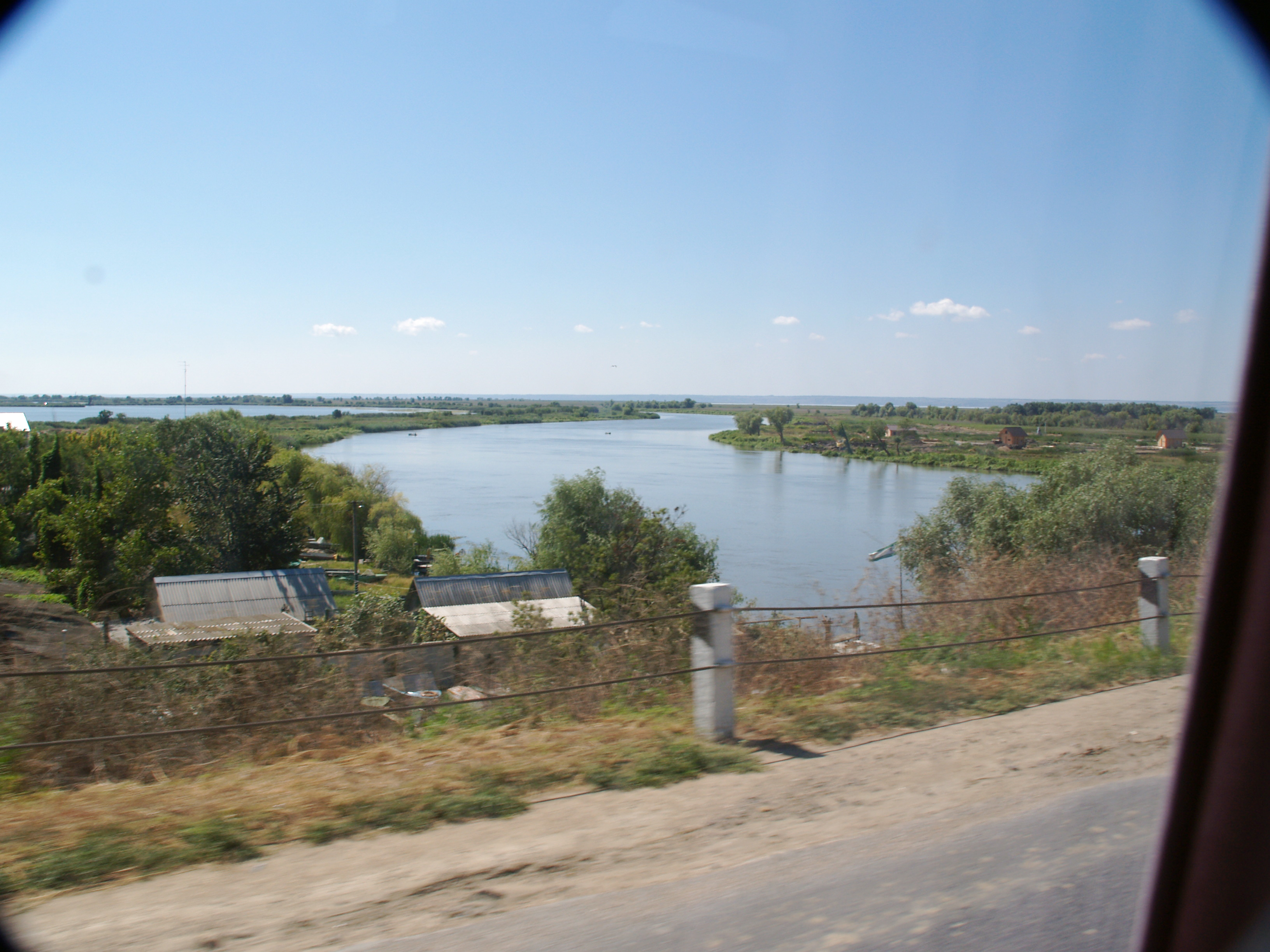
- A view of Palanca from the M15
- Interactive map of Palanca
- Location in Moldova
- Coordinates: 46°24′34″N 30°05′35″E
- Country: Moldova
- District: Ștefan Vodă District

Population (2014 census)
  - Total: 1,708
- Time zone: UTC+2 (EET)
  - Summer (DST): UTC+3 (EEST)

Palanca is a village in Ștefan Vodă District, Moldova, near the border with Ukraine. Situated at a longitude of 30°06' east, it is the country's easternmost point and lowest point.

== Border dispute ==
Among the most sensitive areas of the Moldova–Ukraine relations is the crossing point at Palanca. Under a 2001 treaty, Moldova committed to transfer control and sovereignty of the 7.7 km (4 3/4 miles) stretch of road between Maiaky and Udobne, which forms part of the M15 from Odesa and Reni. The demarcation process took many years. In 2010 Deputy Foreign Minister of Moldova Andrei Popov stated that land in Palanca was an inseparable part of the Moldovan territory and would not be ceded to Ukraine. However, on November 22, 2012, the Moldovan ambassador to Ukraine announced that Moldova had transferred the section of the road by Palanca and that it had become property of Ukraine within the territory of Moldova, which would be controlled by Ukraine.

== Notable people ==
- Gheorghe Ghidirim

== See also ==
- Extreme points of Moldova
