= The Bishop of Lovech =

The Bishop of Lovech (Bulgarian: Ловчанският владика) is a Bulgarian comedy play by Teodosiy Ikonomov, considered the first Bulgarian play. Ikonomov wrote it in 1857 as a student in Constantinople, in response to the lack of Bulgarian works available, but it was not published until 1863 in Bolgrad due to poor finances. The play is narrated from the viewpoint of Petko Slaveykov, who relates the struggle for independence of the Bulgarian Church.
