= Nadlymanske =

Rural locality in Odesa Oblast, Ukraine

Nadlymanske Надлиманське
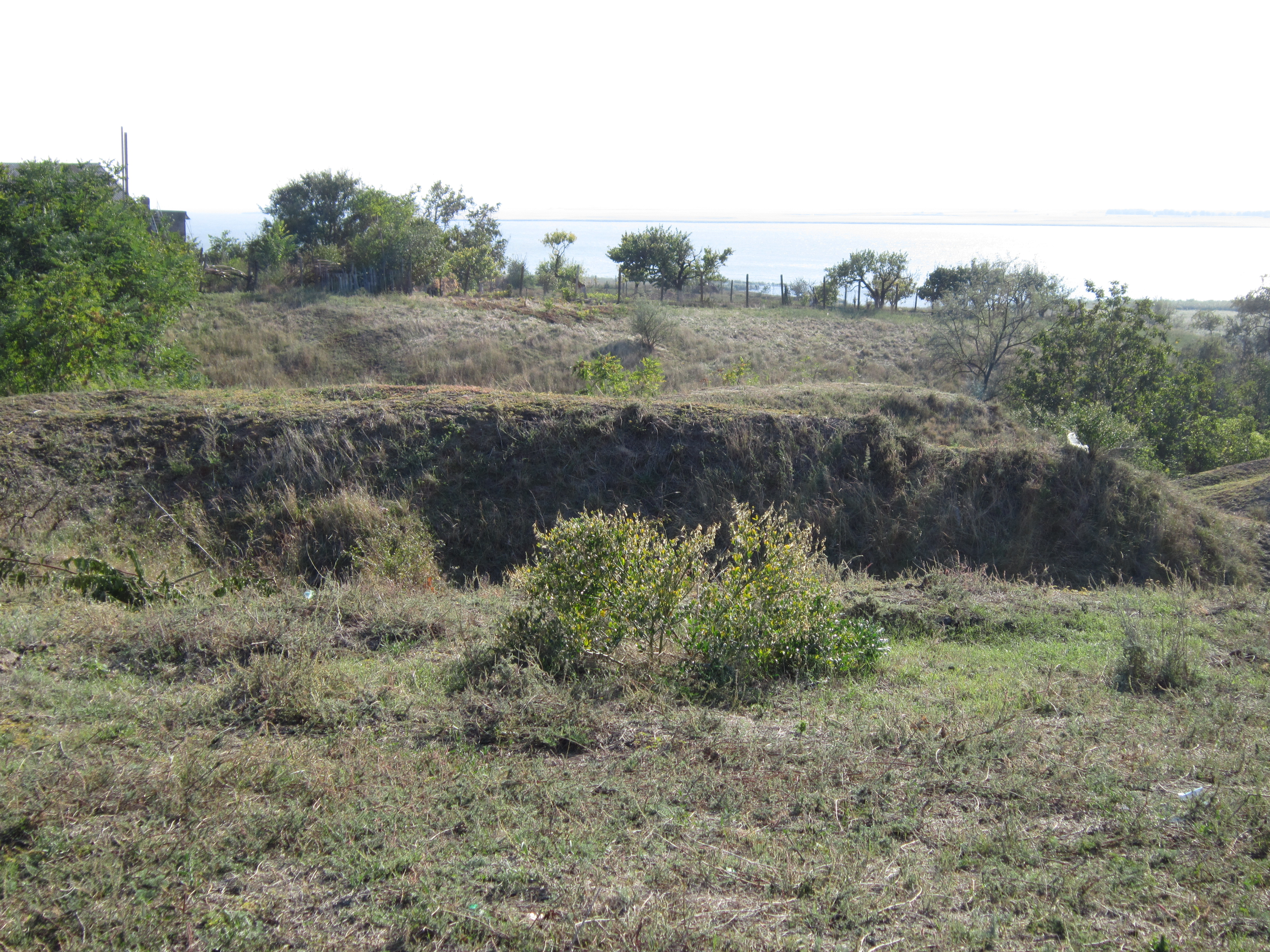

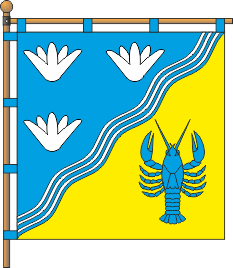
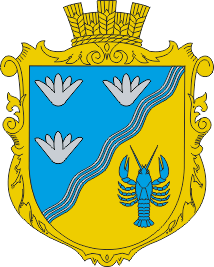
- Flag Coat of arms

- Location in Ukraine Nadlymanske (Odesa Oblast)
- Coordinates: 46°22′22″N 30°20′00″E
- Country: Ukraine
- Oblast: Odesa Oblast
- Raion: Odesa Raion
- Hromada: Maiaky rural hromada
- Village founded: 1805

Area
  - Total: 5.595 km^{2} (2.160 sq mi)

Population (2001)
  - Total: 1,806
- Time zone: UTC+2 (EET (Kyiv))
  - Summer (DST): UTC+3 (EEST)
- Postal code: 67812
- Area code: +380 4851(64)
- Former name: Franzfeld (1805—1944)

Nadlymanske (Ukrainian: Надлиманське) is a village in Odesa Raion of Odesa Oblast in Ukraine. It belongs to Maiaky rural hromada, one of the hromadas of Ukraine. Nadlymanske is located along the northeast edge of the Dniester Estuary northwest of Ovidiopol.

== History ==
The first record of residents at this location is 1805. A village called Franzfeld was subsequently established there in 1808 by German immigrants to the Black Sea Region, then later part of the Russian Empire. It received its present name after the remaining German residents were driven from the area by the advancing Soviet army in 1944.

Anton Zerr, the Roman Catholic bishop of Tiraspol from 1889 to 1902, was born in Franzfeld in 1849.

Until 18 July 2020, Nadlymanske belonged to Ovidiopol Raion. The raion was abolished in July 2020 as part of the administrative reform of Ukraine, which reduced the number of raions of Odesa Oblast to seven. The area of Ovidiopol Raion was split between Odesa and Bilhorod-Dnistrovskyi Raions, with Nadlymanske being transferred to Odesa Raion.

== See also ==
- Flight and evacuation of German civilians during the end of World War II
