= Zheleznodorozhny City District =

Zheleznodorozhny City District may refer to:

- Zheleznodorozhny City District, Russia, several city divisions in Russia
- Zheleznodorozhny City District, alternative name of Zaliznychnyi District, a city district of Lviv, Ukraine
- Zaliznytsia Raion, Simferopol, a city district of Simferopol, Ukraine

== See also ==
- Zheleznodorozhny (disambiguation)
