= Zheleznodorozhny City District, Russia =

Zheleznodorozhny City District is the name of several city divisions in Russia. The name literally means "pertaining to rail transport".

1. Zheleznodorozhny City District, Barnaul, a city district of Barnaul, the administrative center of Altai Krai
2. Zheleznodorozhny Administrative District, an administrative district of the city of Chita, the administrative center of Zabaykalsky Krai
3. Zheleznodorozhny City District, Khabarovsk, a city district of Khabarovsk, the administrative center of Khabarovsk Krai
4. Zheleznodorozhny City District, Krasnoyarsk, a city district of Krasnoyarsk, the administrative center of Krasnoyarsk Krai
5. Zheleznodorozhny Okrug, Kursk, an okrug of the city of Kursk, the administrative center of Kursk Oblast
6. Zheleznodorozhny City District, Novosibirsk, a city district of Novosibirsk, the administrative center of Novosibirsk Oblast
7. Zheleznodorozhny City District, Oryol, a city district of Oryol, the administrative center of Oryol Oblast
8. Zheleznodorozhny City District, Penza, a city district of Penza, the administrative center of Penza Oblast
9. Zheleznodorozhny City District, Rostov-on-Don, a city district of Rostov-on-Don, the administrative center of Rostov Oblast
10. Zheleznodorozhny City District, Ryazan, a city district of Ryazan, the administrative center of Ryazan Oblast
11. Zheleznodorozhny City District, Samara, an administrative and municipal city district of Samara, the administrative center of Samara Oblast
12. Zheleznodorozhny City District, Ulan-Ude, a city district of Ulan-Ude, the capital of the Republic of Buryatia
13. Zheleznodorozhny City District, Ulyanovsk, a city district of Ulyanovsk, the administrative center of Ulyanovsk Oblast
14. Zheleznodorozhny City District, Voronezh, a city district of Voronezh, the administrative center of Voronezh Oblast
15. Zheleznodorozhny City District, Yekaterinburg, a city district of Yekaterinburg, the administrative center of Sverdlovsk Oblast
Cities in Russia with a city division called "Zheleznodorozhny"

== See also ==
- Zheleznodorozhny (disambiguation)
- Zheleznodorozhny Okrug (disambiguation)
