= Libental =

Rural locality in Odesa Oblast, Ukraine

Libental Лібенталь
- Location in Ukraine Libental (Odesa Oblast)
- Coordinates: 46°25′41″N 30°27′57″E
- Country: Ukraine
- Oblast: Odesa Oblast
- Raion: Odesa Raion
- Hromada: Maiaky rural hromada
- Village founded: 1925

Area
  - Total: 1.149 km^{2} (0.444 sq mi)

Population (2001)
  - Total: 414
- Time zone: UTC+2 (EET (Kyiv))
  - Summer (DST): UTC+3 (EEST)
- Postal code: 67811
- Area code: +380 4851
- Former name: Adolfstal (1941–1944), Lenintal (1944–2016)

Libental (Ukrainian: Лібенталь) is a village in Odesa Raion of Odesa Oblast in Ukraine. It belongs to Maiaky rural hromada, one of the hromadas of Ukraine. Until 2017, the village belonged to the Yosypivka Selsoviet, which also included the village Yosypivka, and until 2020 it was located in Ovidiopol Raion. Since then, the village has been administratively part of the Mayaky rural hromada in the west of Odessa Raion.

== History ==
The village was founded in 1925 by German colonists from the neighboring colony of Gross Libental. The village was occupied by Romanian army on August 31, 1941. During the German-Romanian occupation (1941–1944), it was called Adolfstal (in honor of Adolf Hitler). On April 11, 1944, it was occupied by the Red Army and returned to the Soviet Union. The German population was evicted on March 20, 1944. Renamed to Lenintal (in honor of Vladimir Lenin). The village had that name until 2016. In 2016, the historical name Libental was returned as part of decommunization.

== See also ==
- Flight and evacuation of German civilians during the end of World War II
