= Yosypivka, Odesa Raion, Odesa Oblast =

Rural locality in Odesa Oblast, Ukraine

Yosypivka Йосипівка
- Village
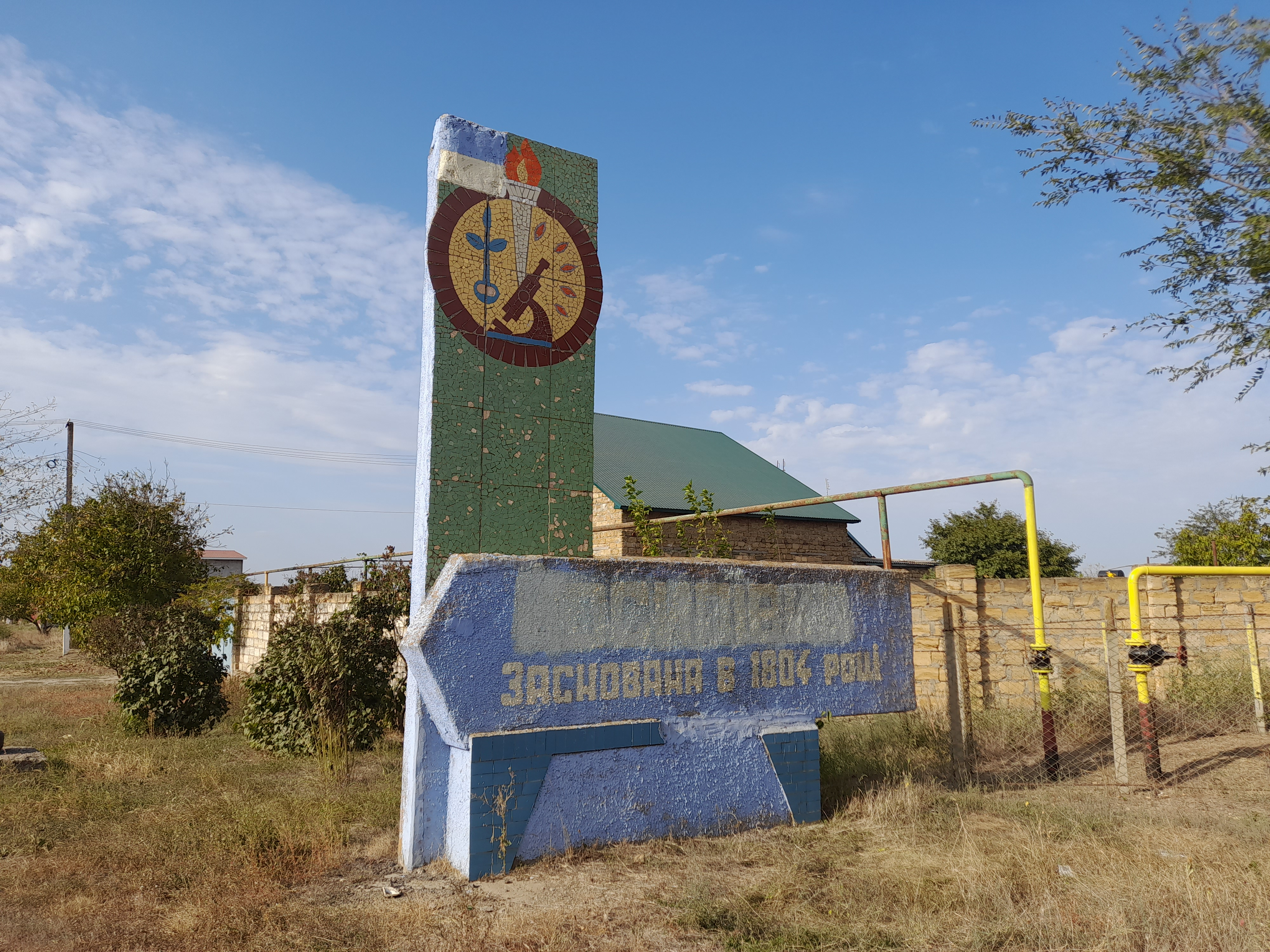
- The stele at the entrance to the village from the Maryanivka side

- Location in Ukraine Yosypivka (Odesa Oblast)
- Coordinates: 46°24′20″N 30°26′8″E
- Country: Ukraine
- Oblast: Odesa Oblast
- Raion: Odesa Raion
- Hromada: Maiaky rural hromada
- Village founded: 1804

Area
  - Total: 5.044 km^{2} (1.947 sq mi)

Population (2001)
  - Total: 1,432
- Time zone: UTC+2 (EET (Kyiv))
  - Summer (DST): UTC+3 (EEST)
- Postal code: 67811
- Area code: +380 4851
- Former name: Josephsthal (1804–1896); Serhiyevka (1896–1917); Josephsthal (1917–1945)

Yosypivka (Ukrainian: Йосипівка; until February 1, 1945, Ukrainian: Іозефсталь; Russian: Юзефсталь; German: Josephsthal) is a village in Odesa Raion of Odesa Oblast in Ukraine. It belongs to Maiaky rural hromada, one of the hromadas of Ukraine. Until 2017, the village formed its own Selsoviet, which also included the village of Libental, formerly Liebenthal, and until 2020 it was located in Ovidiopol Raion. Since then, the village has been administratively part of the Mayaky rural hromada in the west of Odessa Raion.

== History ==
In 1792, these lands were allocated as a dacha to Major General Kislenskyi. However, the area was later transferred to German immigrants from Württemberg, Baden, Palatinate, Alsace, Silesia, Bohemia, Switzerland, Hungary, who founded the village of Josephsthal here in 1804. The village belonged to the Liebenthal colonist district of the Gros-Libenthal parish of the Odessa uezd of the Kherson Governorate.

In 1805, a Roman Catholic parish was founded here, the first pastor of which was Alois Lefleur. The Roman Catholic Church of Saint Joseph was built in 1806, and in 1832 it was thoroughly renovated and rebuilt. From 1832, the future bishop, Father Kasper Borovsky, worked as abbot in Josephsthal for several years. In 1809, a new parish school was founded at the church (the old one had existed since the founding of the village). By 1861, the old church had become unusable and a new one was built at the expense of the parishioners in its place. On September 2, 1862, the new church was consecrated by the auxiliary bishop of Tiraspol, Wincenty Lipski. As of 1886, this German colony had a population of 1,153 people, 121 households, and a Roman Catholic church and school. In 1896, the village was renamed Serhiyevka, in honor of the deceased brother of Nicholas II, Grand Duke Sergei Alexandrovich. This name lasted until 1917, after which the old name was returned.

During the Soviet era, the church was destroyed. The village was renamed on February 1, 1945, to Yosypivka, thus preserving the name of the saint. Currently, the dilapidated building of the parish school has been preserved, next to which are the remains of the foundation of the church. The building of the parish house has also been preserved, which in the 1990s was transferred to the Moscow Patriarchate, which opened the Orthodox Church of St. Andrew in it.

== See also ==
- Flight and evacuation of German civilians during the end of World War II
