= EUBAM =

EUBAM may refer to:

- European Union Border Assistance Mission to Moldova and Ukraine (border between Moldova and Ukraine)
- European Union Border Assistance Mission Rafah (border between Egypt and the Gaza Strip, Palestinian territories)
