= Zaliznychnyi District =

Zaliznychnyi District (Ukrainian: Залізни́чний райо́н) may refer to the following urban districts in Ukraine:

- Zaliznychnyi District, Lviv
- Zaliznychnyi District, Simferopol

== See also ==
- Zheleznodorozhny (disambiguation) Russian equivalent of Zaliznychnyi
