= Zheleznodorozhnoye Urban Settlement =

Zheleznodorozhnoye Urban Settlement is the name of several municipal formations in Russia.

- Zheleznodorozhnoye Urban Settlement, a municipal formation which the work settlement of Zheleznodorozhny in Ust-Ilimsky District of Irkutsk Oblast is incorporated as
- Zheleznodorozhnoye Urban Settlement, a municipal formation which the urban-type settlement of district significance of Zheleznodorozhny in Pravdinsky District of Kaliningrad Oblast is incorporated as

== See also ==
- Zheleznodorozhny (disambiguation)
