= Maiaky rural hromada =

Coordinates: 46°24′10″N 30°17′40″E

Maiaky rural hromada Маяківська сільська громада
- Hromada
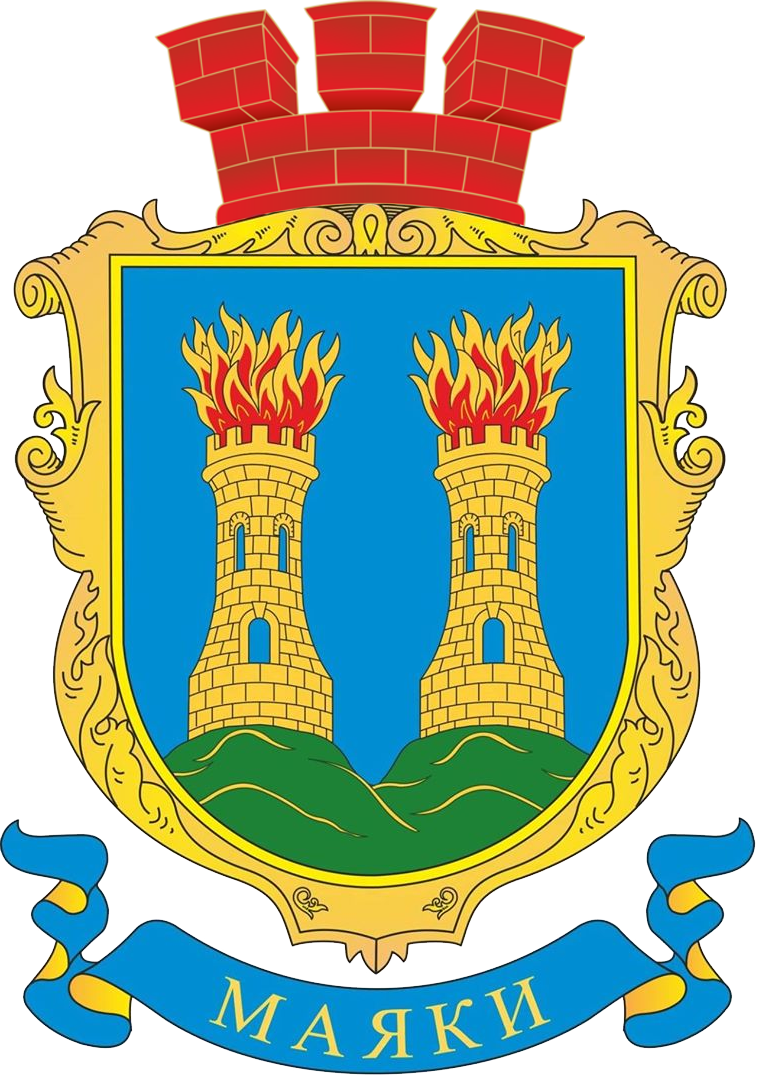
- Coat of arms
- Interactive map of Maiaky rural hromada
- Country: Ukraine
- Oblast: Odesa Oblast
- Raion: Odesa Raion
- Admin. center: Maiaky

Area
  - Total: 116.25 km^{2} (44.88 sq mi)

Population (2020)
  - Total: 9,645
  - Density: 82.97/km^{2} (214.9/sq mi)
- CATOTTG code: UA51100210000074534
- Settlements: 5
- Villages: 5

Maiaky rural hromada (Ukrainian: Маяківська сільська громада) is a hromada of Ukraine, located in Odesa Raion, Odesa Oblast. Its administrative center is the village Maiaky.

It was created on 28 October 2017, and its territory was expanded to its current size on 17 July 2020.

The hromada has a population of 5,597 people, and it contains five villages:

- Libental
- Maiaky (seat of administration)
- Nadlymanske
- Udobne
- Yosypivka
