= Starokozache Solar Park =

Solar park in Odesa Oblast, Ukraine

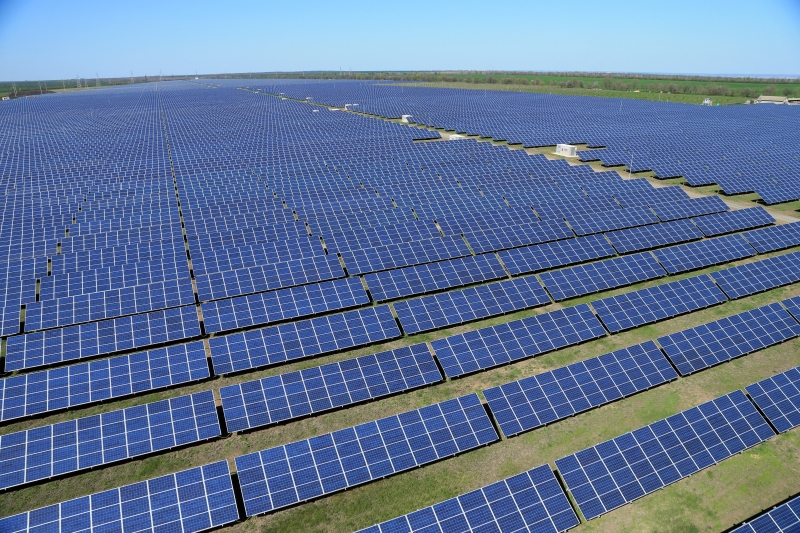
- Country: Ukraine
- Location: Odesa Oblast
- Coordinates: 46°20′45″N 30°00′06″E
- Status: Operational
- Commission date: 10 July 2012
- Owner: Activ Solar

Solar farm
- Type: Flat-panel PV
- Site area: 80 ha

Power generation
- Units operational: 186,000
- Nameplate capacity: 42.95 MW

The Starokozache Solar Park (Ukrainian: СЕС «Старокозаче», also sometimes Starokozacha) is a 42.95 MW photovoltaic power station in Starokozache, Odesa Oblast, Ukraine.

In total, 185,952 multicrystalline photovoltaic modules, 41 inverter stations and 621 kilometers of cable were installed on an area of 80 hectares. The company used Ukrainian components and assemblies in the project. The planned electricity production is 54.1 million kWh per year. This is enough to supply electricity to about 11,000 households and reduce carbon dioxide emissions by 44,000 tons annually.

== See also ==
- List of largest power stations in the world
- List of photovoltaic power stations
