= Bolhrad urban hromada =

Coordinates: 45°41′N 28°36′E

Bolhrad urban hromada Болградська міська громада
- Hromada
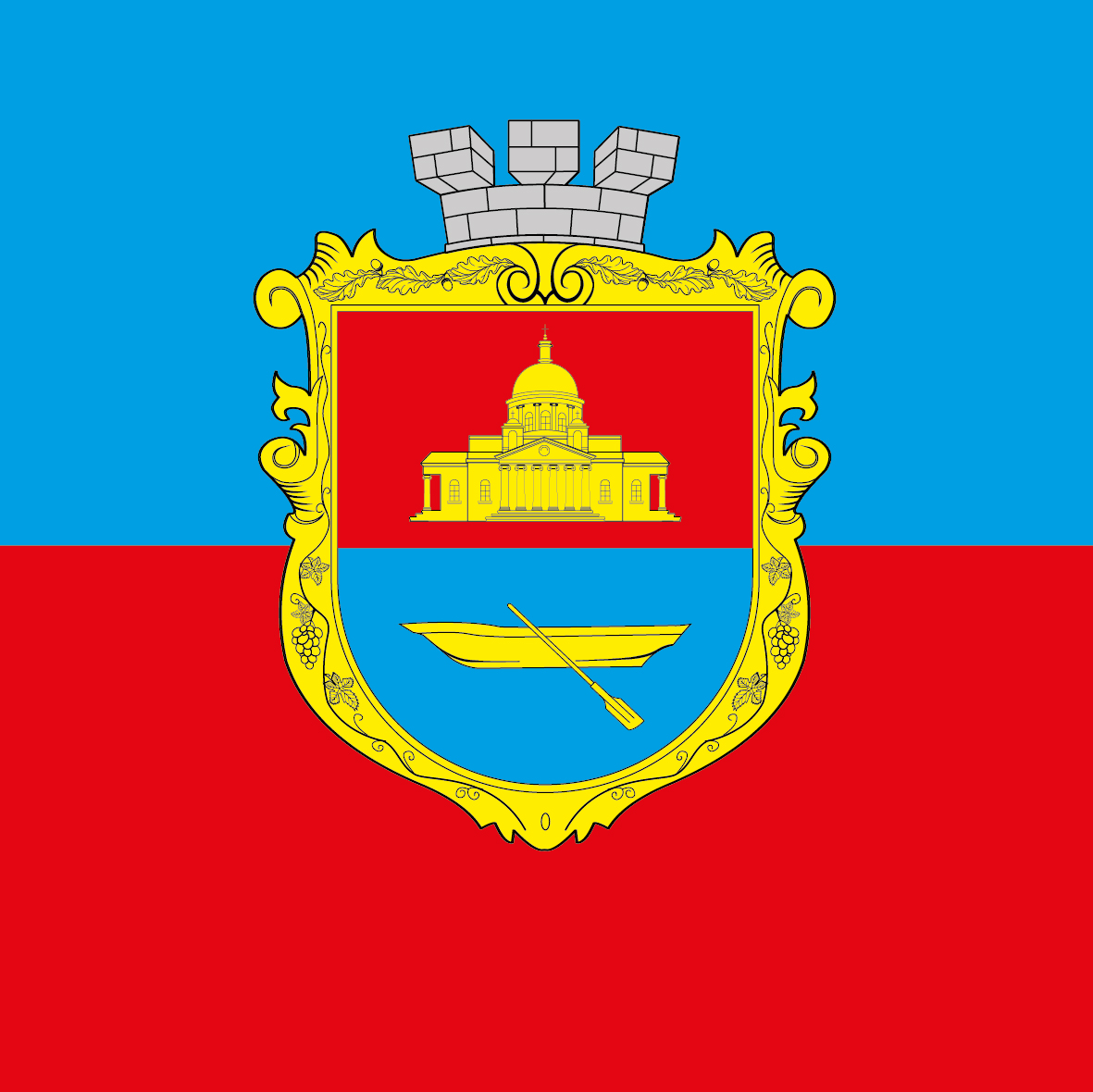
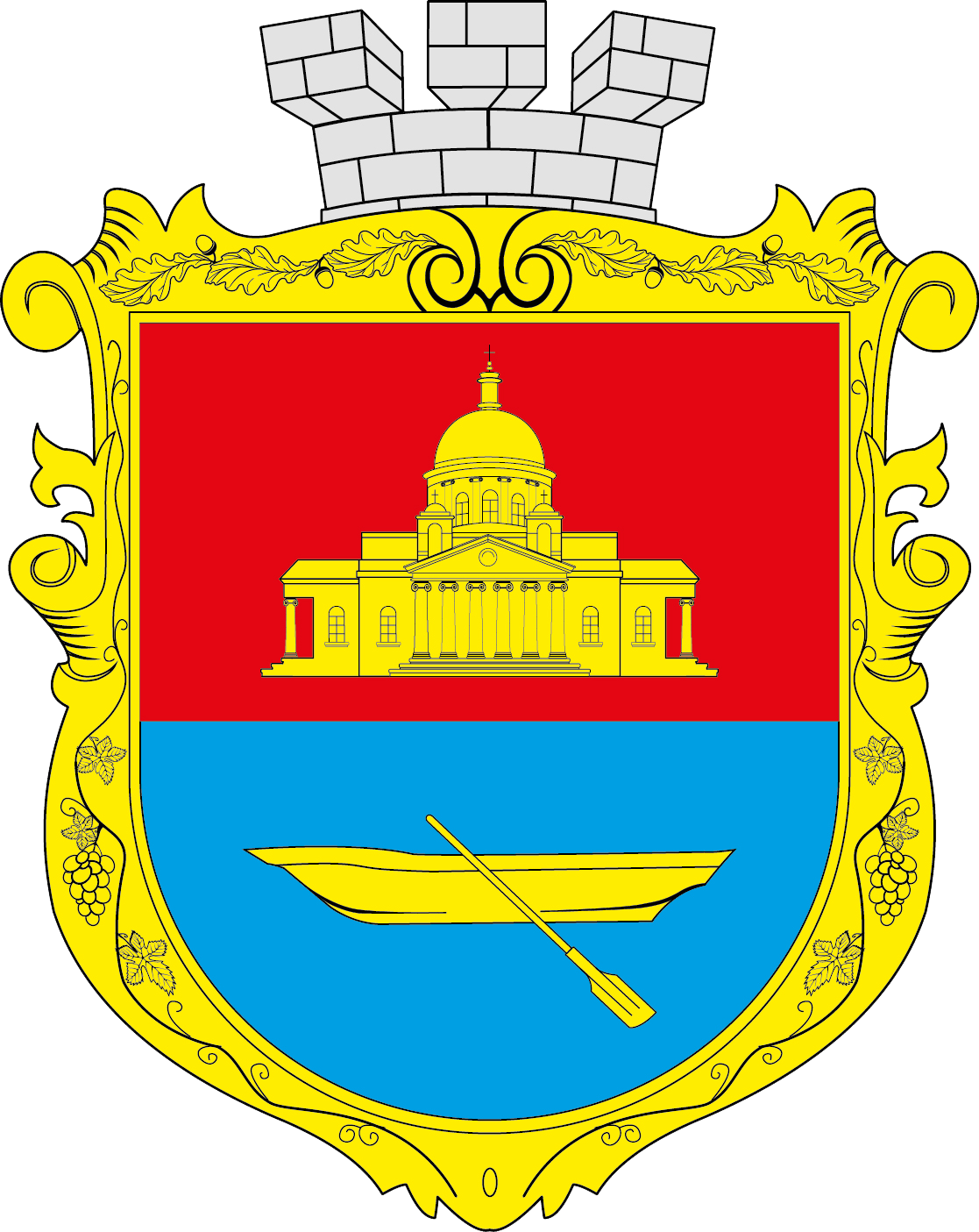
- Flag Coat of arms
- Interactive map of Bolhrad urban hromada
- Country: Ukraine
- Oblast: Odesa Oblast
- Raion: Bolhrad Raion
- Admin. center: Bolhrad

Area
  - Total: 296.4 km^{2} (114.4 sq mi)

Population (2020)
  - Total: 26,253
  - Density: 88.57/km^{2} (229.4/sq mi)
- CATOTTG code: UA51060030000044366
- Settlements: 7
- Cities: 1
- Villages: 6

Bolhrad urban hromada (Ukrainian: Болградська міська громада) is a hromada in Bolhrad Raion of Odesa Oblast in southwestern Ukraine. Population: 26,253 (2020 est.)

The hromada consists of a city of Bolhrad and 6 villages:

- Oksamytne
- Tabaky
- Topolyne
- Vynohradivka
- Vladychen
- Zaliznychne

== Links ==
- Децентралізація влади: Болградська територіальна громада
- https://bolgradska-gromada.gov.ua
