= Zheleznodorozhny, Republic of Bashkortostan =

Zheleznodorozhny Железнодорожный
- Selo
- Location within Bashkortostan Location within Russia
- Coordinates: 53°55′N 58°19′E
- Country: Russia
- Region: Bashkortostan
- District: Beloretsky District
- Time zone: UTC+5:00

Zheleznodorozhny (Russian: Железнодорожный; Bashkir: Тимер юл, Timer yul) is a rural locality (a selo) and the administrative centre of Zheleznodorozhny Selsoviet, Beloretsky District, Bashkortostan, Russia. The population was 3,020 as of 2010. There are 41 streets.

== Geography ==
Zheleznodorozhny is located 10 km southwest of Beloretsk (the district's administrative centre) by road. Lomovka is the nearest rural locality.
