= Dubovoye, Belgorod Oblast =

Dubovoye Дубовое
- Settlement
- Location within Belgorod Oblast Location within Russia
- Coordinates: 50°32′N 36°35′E
- Country: Russia
- Region: Belgorod Oblast
- District: Belgorodsky District
- Time zone: UTC+3:00

Dubovoye (Russian: Дубовое) is a rural locality (a settlement) and the administrative center of Dubovskoye Rural Settlement, Belgorodsky District, Belgorod Oblast, Russia. Population: 16,101 (2021 census); 8,627 (2010 census); There are 225 streets.

== Geography ==
Dubovoye is located 15 km east of Maysky (the district's administrative centre) by road. Tavrovo is the nearest rural locality.
