= Dubovoye, Amur Oblast =

Dubovoye Дубовое
- Selo
- Location within Amur Oblast Location within Russia
- Coordinates: 49°42′N 128°46′E
- Country: Russia
- Region: Amur Oblast
- District: Mikhaylovsky District
- Time zone: UTC+9:00

Dubovoye (Russian: Дубовое) is a rural locality (a selo) and the administrative center of Dubovsky Selsoviet of Mikhaylovsky District, Amur Oblast, Russia. The population was 302 as of 2018. There are 12 streets.

== Geography ==
Dubovoye is located 21 km northeast of Poyarkovo (the district's administrative centre) by road. Privolnoye is the nearest rural locality.
