= Dubove =

Dubove or Dubové may refer to places:

== Ukraine ==
- Dubove, Luhansk Oblast, an urban-type settlement
- Dubove, Zakarpattia Oblast, an urban-type settlement
- Dubove, a village in Mykhalcha commune, Chernivtsi Oblast
- Dubove, a rural settlement in Shakhtarsk commune, Donetsk Oblast

== Slovakia ==
- Dubové, Turčianske Teplice District, a municipality and village
- Dubové, Zvolen District, a municipality and village

== See also ==
- Dubovoye (disambiguation), a list of similarly-named populated places in Russia
- Dubovae, similar name for populated places in Belarus
