= Tabaky =

Village in Ukraine

Coordinates: 45°43′25″N 28°36′34″E

Tabaky (Ukrainian: Табаки) is a village in Ukraine, in the Bolhrad urban hromada of Bolhrad Raion of Odessa Oblast. It had a population of 2,127 in 2024.

== History ==
While a settlement was located on the site during the Late Bronze Age, the modern village was founded in 1812 by settlers from Bessarabia.

== Demographics ==
The village's residents are mostly Bulgarians.
