= Goianul Nou =

Goianul Nou may refer to several places in Moldova:

- Goianul Nou, a village in Stăuceni Commune, Chişinău municipality
- Goianul Nou, a village in Dubău Commune, Transnistria
