= Unguri =

- Village
- Location within Moldova
- Coordinates: 48.4011111111°N 27.8675°E
- Country: Moldova
- District: Ocnița

Government
  - Mayor: Ivan Cuhari (PSRM)

Population (2014 census)
  - Total: 1,355
- Time zone: UTC+2 (EET)
  - Summer (DST): UTC+3 (EEST)

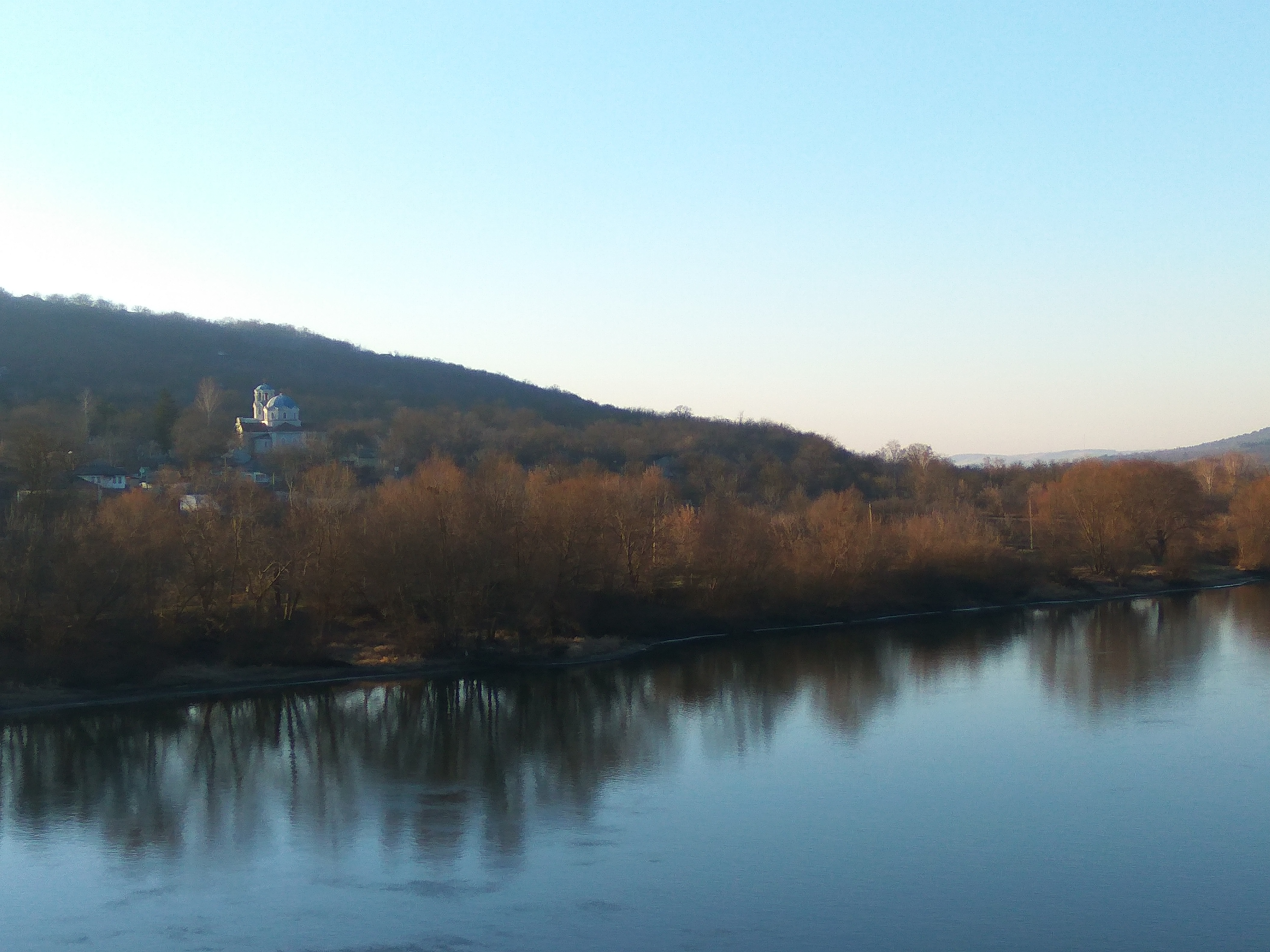
Church in the village. Ungry (Ungur). View from the bridge over the Dniester River.

Unguri is a village in Ocnița District, Moldova.

== Demographics ==
According to the 2014 Moldovan census, Unguri had a population of 1,355 residents. The village spans an area of 20.9 km², with a population density of approximately 64.8 inhabitants per square kilometer as of the 2014 census. Between 2004 and 2014, Unguri saw a slight population decline of 0.89%.

Women slightly outnumbered men, making up 52.8% of the population compared to 47.2% male. The age structure showed that 17.6% of residents were under 15 years old, 68.1% were of working age (15–64), and 14.2% were aged 65 and older. The entire population lived in rural areas.

The majority of residents (95.4%) were born in Moldova, with a minority (4.6%) born in other Commonwealth of Independent States countries. Ethnically, Unguri is predominantly Ukrainian (91.7%), with smaller communities of Moldovans (6.6%) and Russians (1.7%). Ukrainian was the most widely spoken native language (90.4%), followed by Russian (4.6%) and Moldovan (5%). The vast majority of the population (97.9%) identified as Orthodox, while 2.1% followed other religions.

== Administration and local government ==
Unguri is governed by a local council composed of nine members. The most recent local elections, in November 2023, resulted in the following composition: 8 councillors from the Party of Socialists of the Republic of Moldova and 1 councillor from the Party of Communists of the Republic of Moldova. In the same elections, the candidate from the Party of Socialists of the Republic of Moldova, Ivan Cuhari, was re-elected as mayor with 100% of the vote, receiving all 537 valid votes cast. His opponent, Chirill Mailovschii from the Chance Political Party, received no votes.
