= Dubovoye, Svetloyarsky District, Volgograd Oblast =

Dubovoye Дубовое
- Settlement
- Location within Volgograd Oblast Location within Russia
- Coordinates: 48°11′N 43°56′E
- Country: Russia
- Region: Volgograd Oblast
- District: Svetloyarsky District
- Time zone: UTC+4:00

Dubovoye (Russian: Дубовое) is a rural locality (a settlement) in Svetloyarsky District, Volgograd Oblast, Russia. The population was 16 as of 2010. There are two streets.

== Geography ==
Dubovoye is located 95 km southwest of Svetly Yar (the district's administrative centre) by road. Kapkinka is the nearest rural locality.
