= Zheleznodorozhny, Perm Krai =

Zheleznodorozhny Железнодорожный
- Settlement
- Location within Perm Krai Location within Russia
- Coordinates: 59°20′N 57°01′E
- Country: Russia
- Region: Perm Krai
- District: Usolsky District
- Time zone: UTC+5:00

Zheleznodorozhny (Russian: Железнодоро́жный) is a rural locality (a settlement) and the administrative center of Troitskoye Rural Settlement, Usolsky District, Perm Krai, Russia. The population was 1,815 as of 2010. There are 31 streets.

== Geography ==
Zheleznodorozhny is located 38 km southeast of Usolye (the district's administrative centre) by road. Shishi is the nearest rural locality.
