= Velyka Kisnytsia =

Velyka Kisnytsia Велика Кісниця Wielka Kośnica Великая Косница
- Village
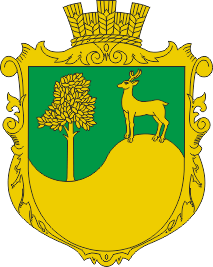
- Coat of arms
- Interactive map of Velyka Kisnytsia
- Location in Vinnytsia Oblast Location in Ukraine
- Coordinates: 48°8′22″N 28°27′45″E
- Country: Ukraine
- Oblast: Vinnytsia Oblast
- Raion: Mohyliv-Podilskyi Raion
- Hromada: Yampil Urban Hromada

Area
  - Total: 81.87 km^{2} (31.61 sq mi)
- Elevation: 47 m (154 ft)

Population (2020)
  - Total: 2,528
  - Density: 30.88/km^{2} (79.97/sq mi)
- Time zone: UTC+2 (EET)
  - Summer (DST): UTC+3 (EEST)
- Postal code: 24546
- Area code: +380 4336
- KATOTTH: UA05080110050056014

Velyka Kisnytsia (Polish: Wielka Kośnica, Russian: Великая Косница) is a village in Yampil Urban Community, Mohyliv-Podilskyi Raion, Vinnytsia Oblast, Ukraine. The population is 2,528 (as of 2020).

On the 1650 map of Guillaume Le Vasseur de Beauplan, the village of Velyka Kisnytsia is called Kouczeniecz.
