= Dubovoye, Yelansky District, Volgograd Oblast =

Dubovoye Дубовое
- Selo
- Location within Volgograd Oblast Location within Russia
- Coordinates: 50°57′N 43°37′E
- Country: Russia
- Region: Volgograd Oblast
- District: Yelansky District
- Time zone: UTC+4:00

Dubovoye (Russian: Дубовое) is a rural locality (a selo) and the administrative center of Dubovskoye Rural Settlement, Yelansky District, Volgograd Oblast, Russia. The population was 819 as of 2010. There are 15 streets.

== Geography ==
Dubovoye is located 10 km northwest of Yelan (the district's administrative centre) by road. Volkovo is the nearest rural locality.
