= European Union Border Assistance Mission to Moldova and Ukraine =

EU border support mission

- Abbreviation: EUBAM Moldova and Ukraine
- Formation: 2005
- Dissolved: 30 November 2025
- Headquarters: Odesa, Ukraine
- Parent organization: European Union
- Website: https://eubam.org/

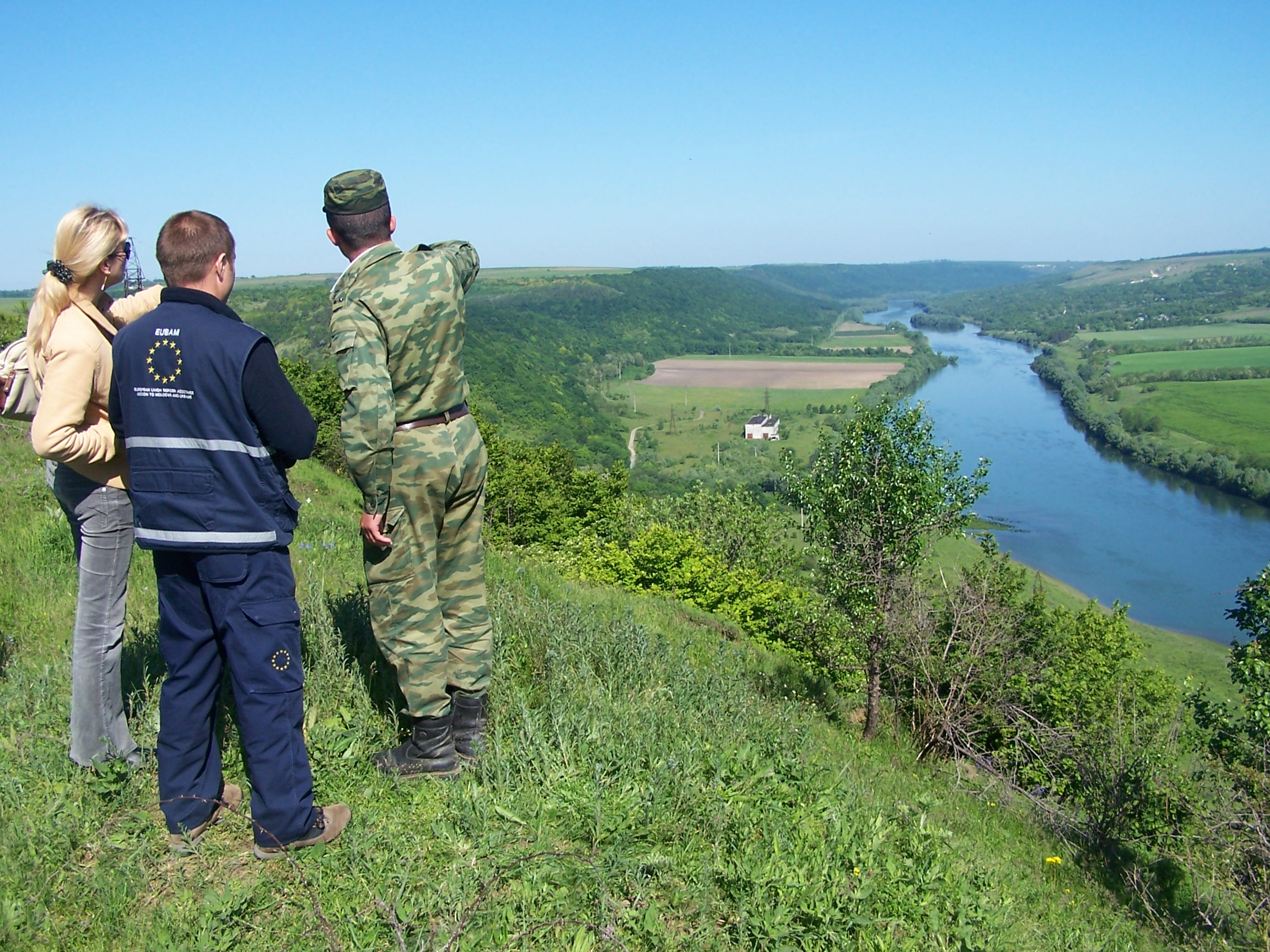
EUBAM experts monitor border with partner services

The European Union Border Assistance Mission to Moldova and Ukraine (EUBAM Moldova and Ukraine) was an EU mission which launched in 2005 and concluded in 2025. It promoted border control, customs, and trade norms and practices that meet European Union standards and serve the needs of its two partner countries. It was an advisory, technical body based in Odesa, Ukraine. It has a Liaison Office in Chișinău, Moldova, and six field offices; three on the Moldovan side of the joint border and three on the Ukrainian side. EUBAM activities were intended to promote economic development and enhance regional security. The Mission contributed to cross-border cooperation and confidence building, helping to improve efficiency, transparency, and security along the Moldova–Ukraine border.

== Aims ==
The Mission's aims were to:

- work with Moldova and Ukraine to harmonize border control, customs, and trade standards and procedures with those of EU Member States
- improve cross-border cooperation between the border guard and customs agencies and other law enforcement bodies; facilitate international coordinated cooperation
- assist Moldova and Ukraine to fulfil the obligations of the Deep and Comprehensive Free Trade Area (DCFTA) they have signed as part of their Association Agreements with the EU
- contribute to the peaceful settlement of the Transnistria conflict through confidence-building measures and a monitoring presence at the Transnistrian segment of the Moldova-Ukraine border
