= Zheleznodorozhny =

Zheleznodorozhny (masculine), Zheleznodorozhnaya (feminine), or Zheleznodorozhnoye (neuter) may refer to:

- Zheleznodorozhny Okrug, various divisions in Russia
- Zheleznodorozhny City District, several divisions in the cities of the former Soviet Union
- Zheleznodorozhnoye Urban Settlement, several municipal urban settlements in Russia
- Zheleznodorozhny, Russia (Zheleznodorozhnaya, Zheleznodorozhnoye), several inhabited localities in Russia
- Zheleznodorozhny, until 1969, name of Qo‘ng‘irot, a town in Uzbekistan
