= Bolhrad =

City in Odesa Oblast, Ukraine

Bolhrad Болград
- City
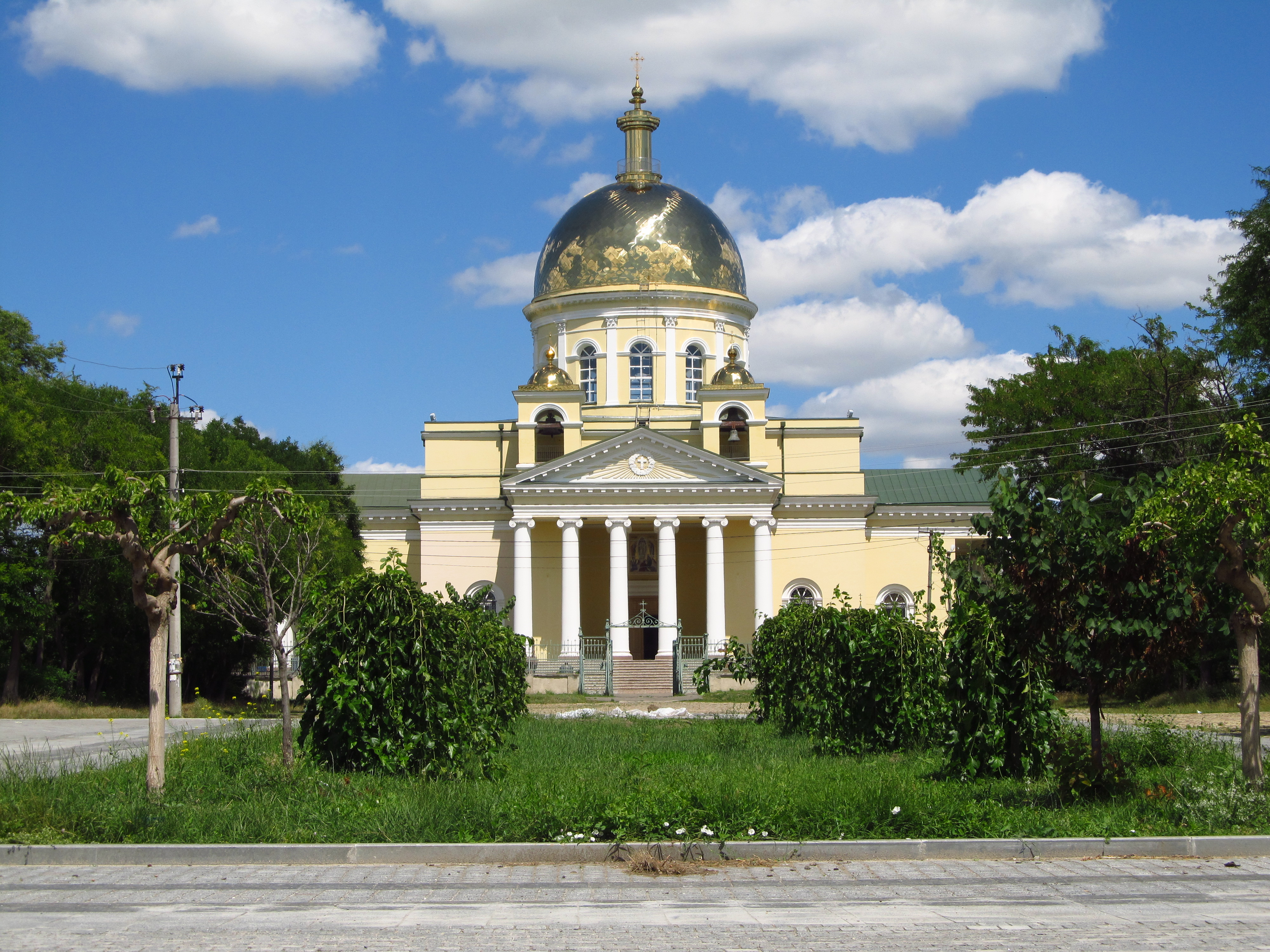
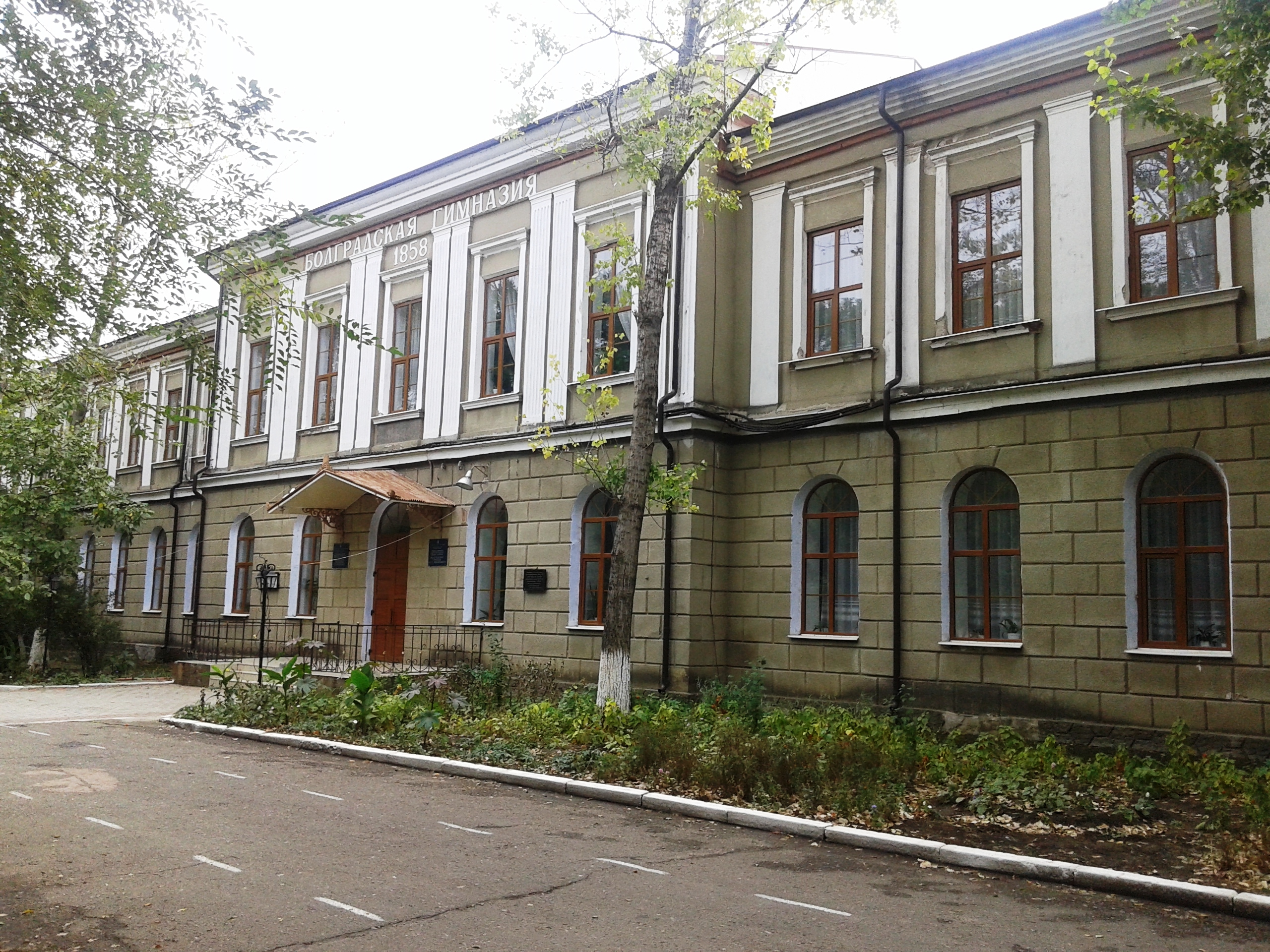
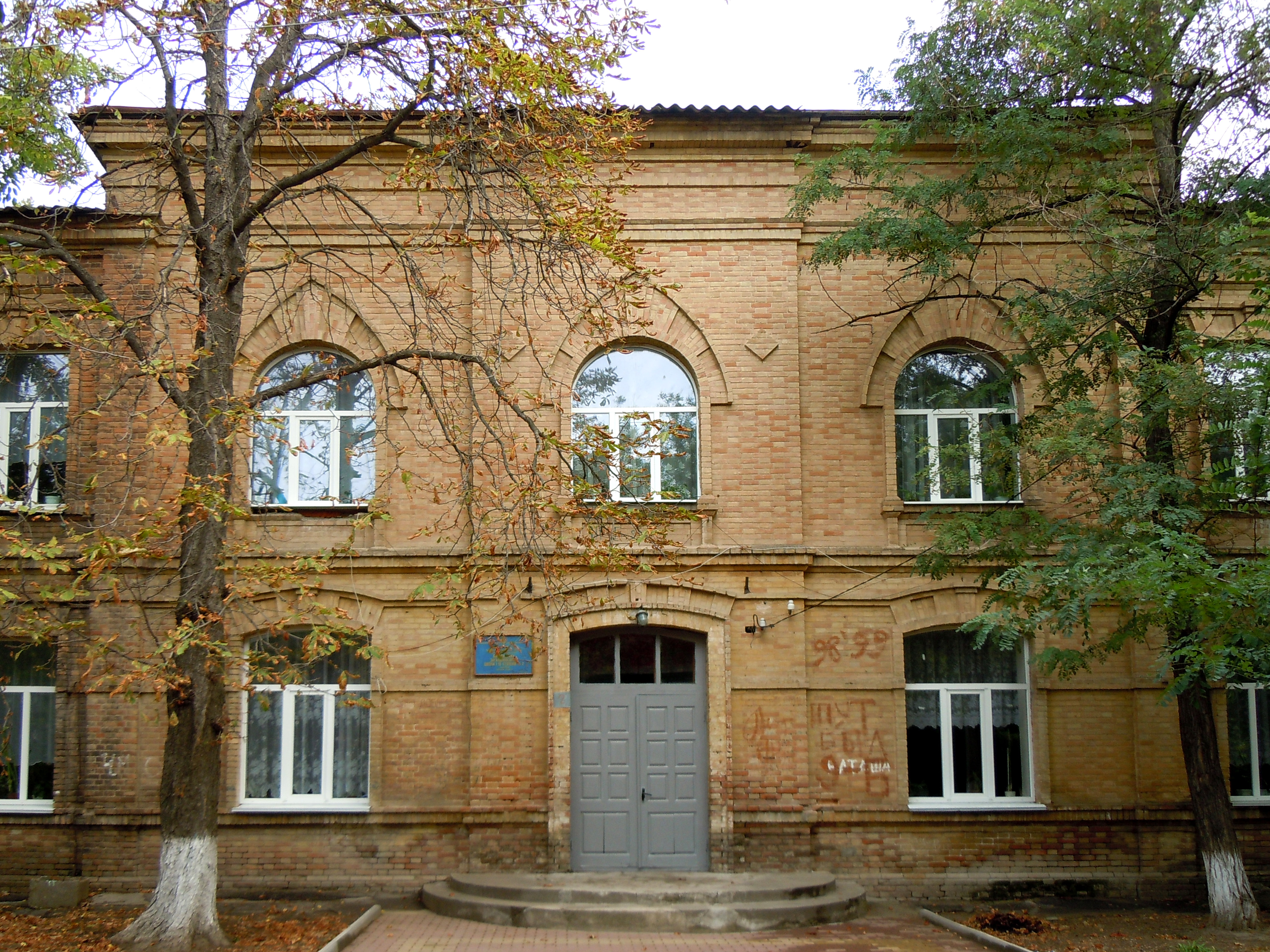
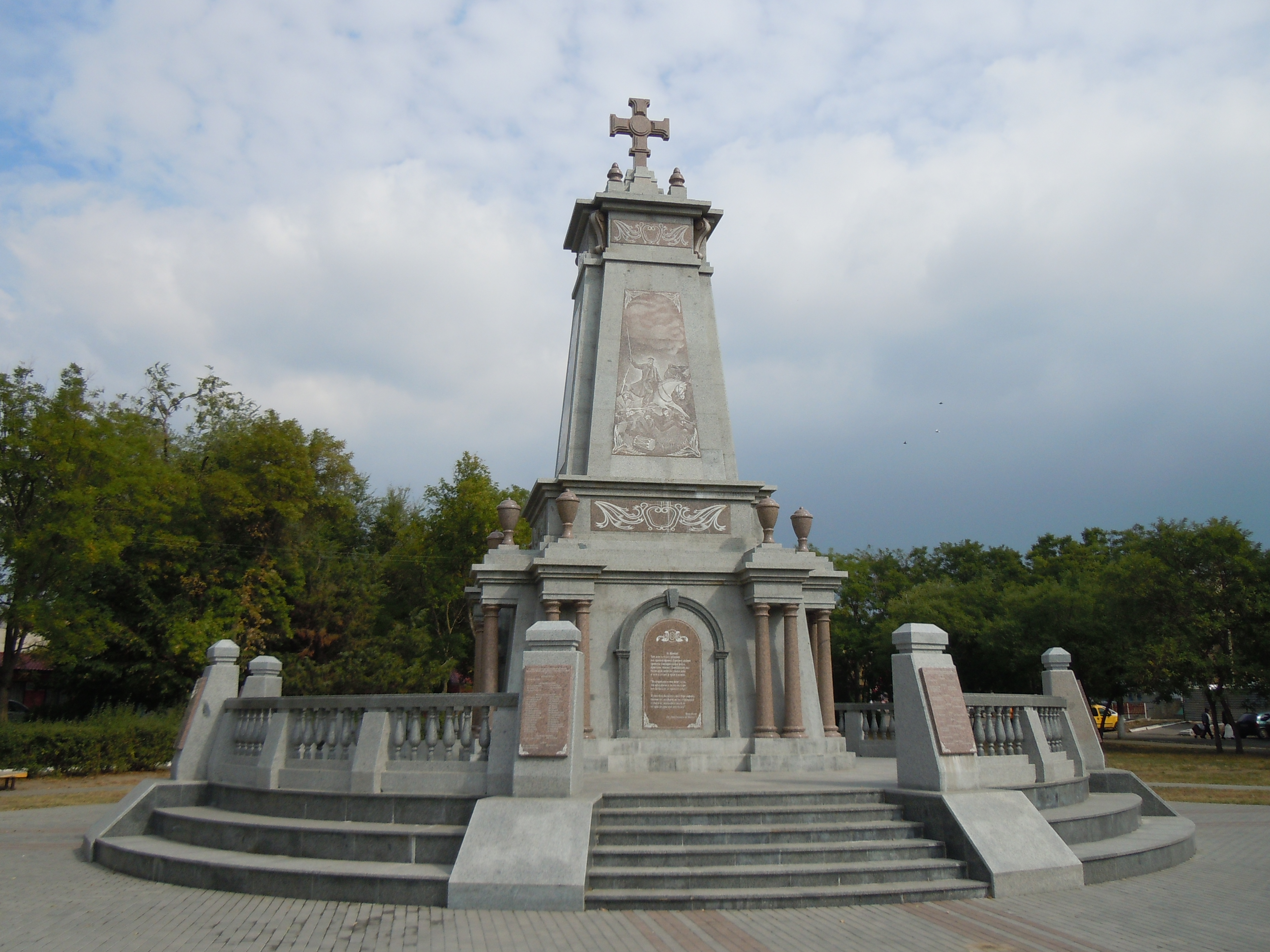
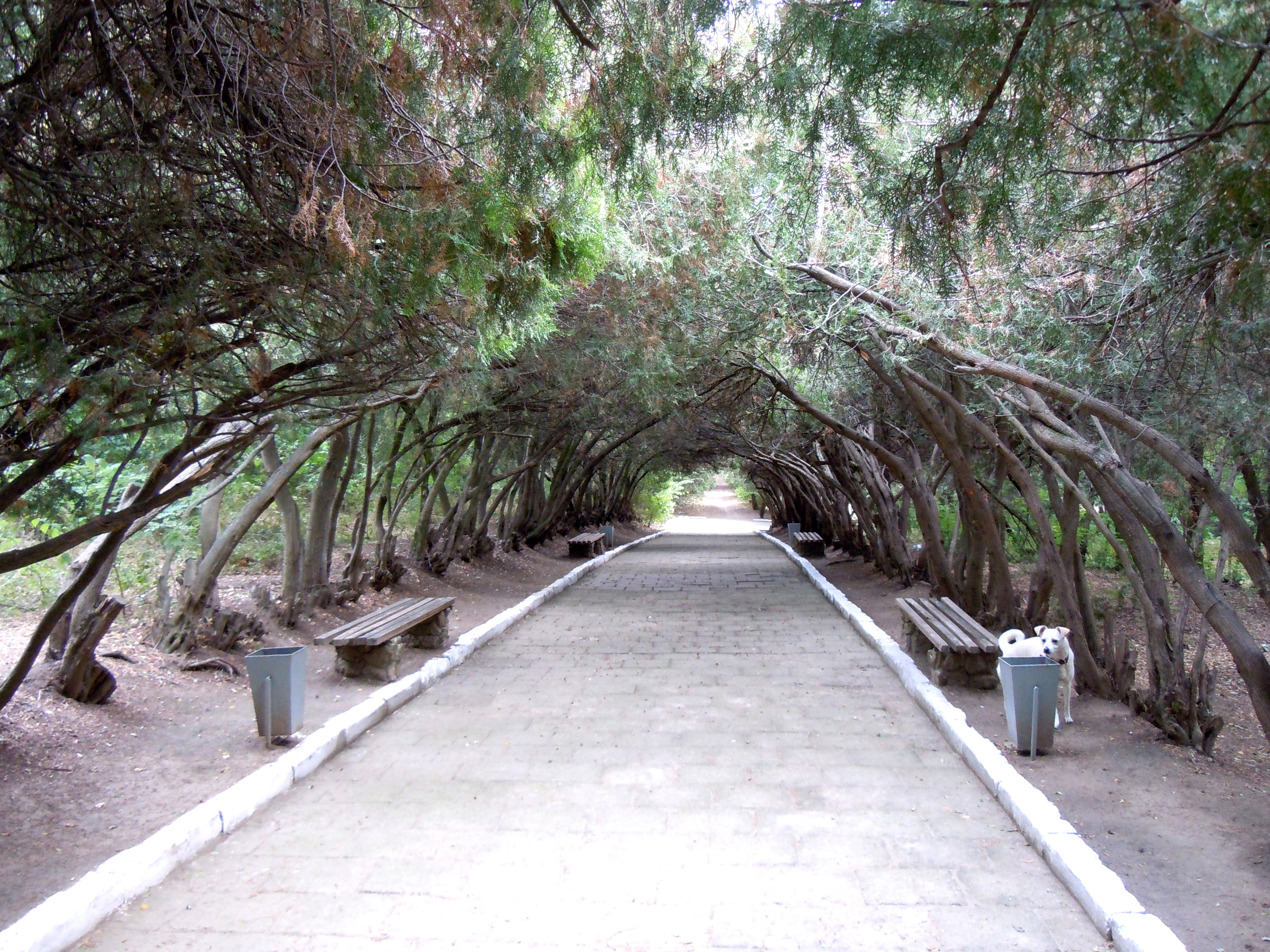
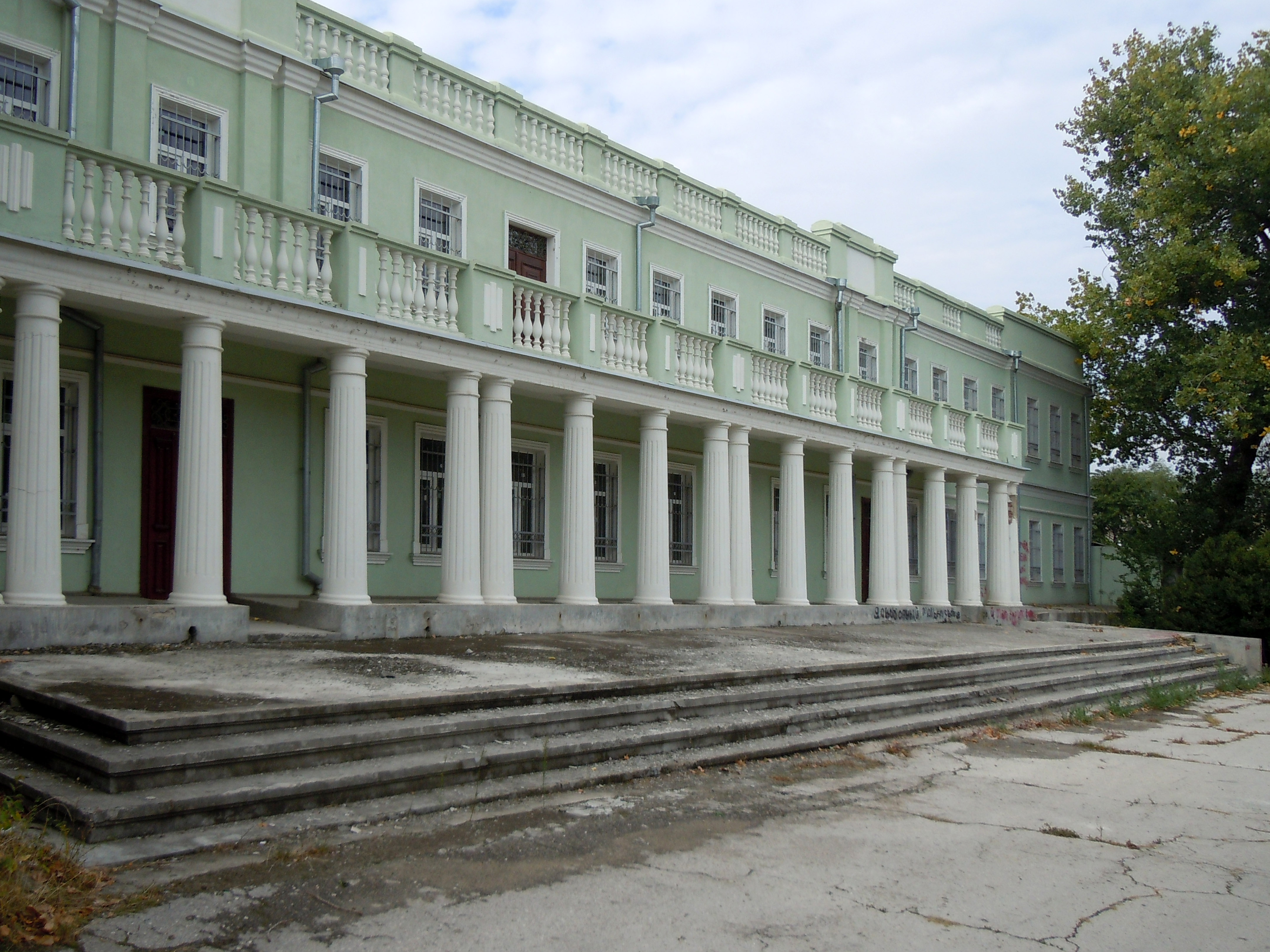
- Transfiguration Cathedral Bolhrad High School Bolhrad Lyceum No. 2 Monument of Bulgarian volunteers Pushkin Park Town hall

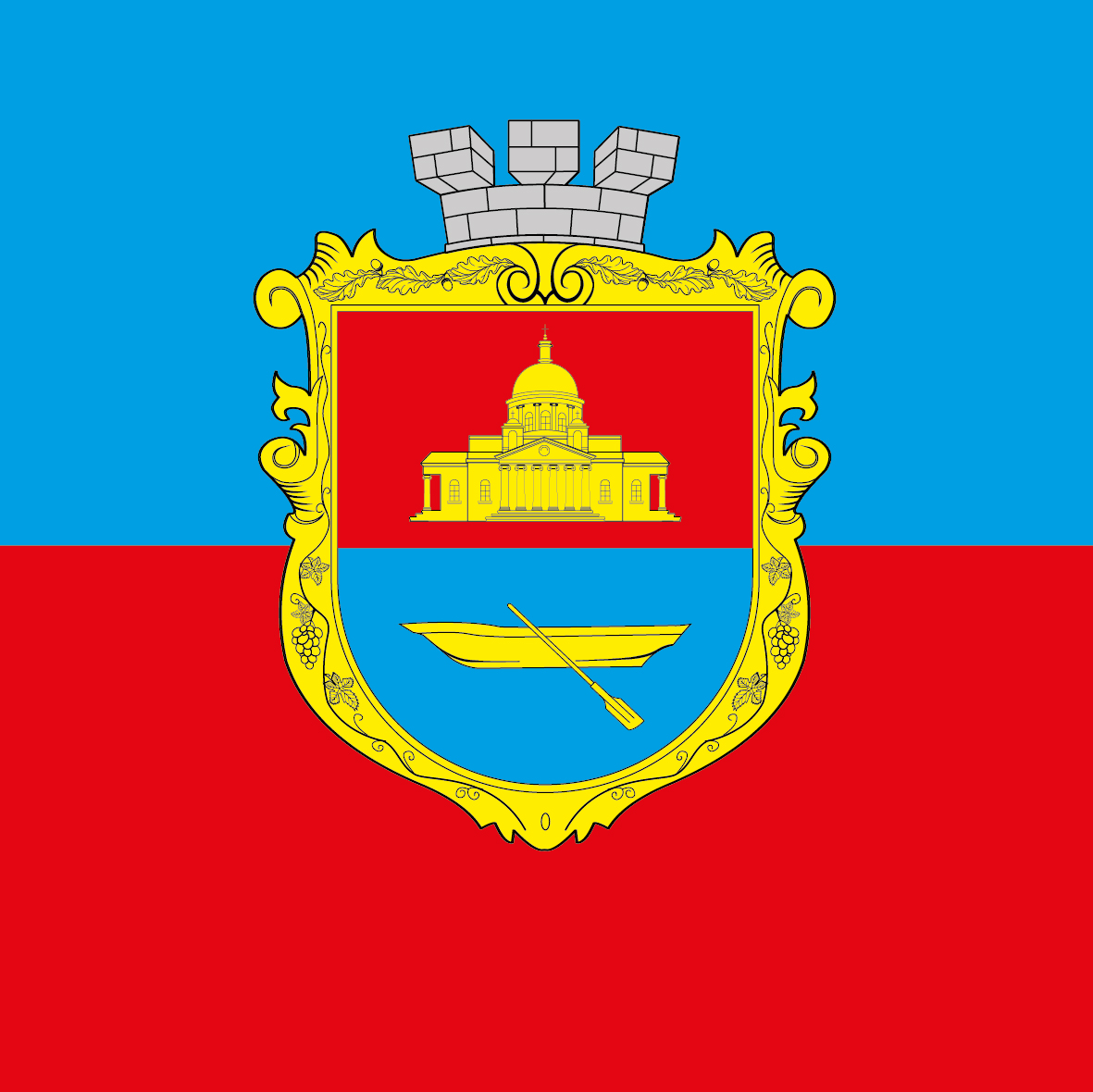
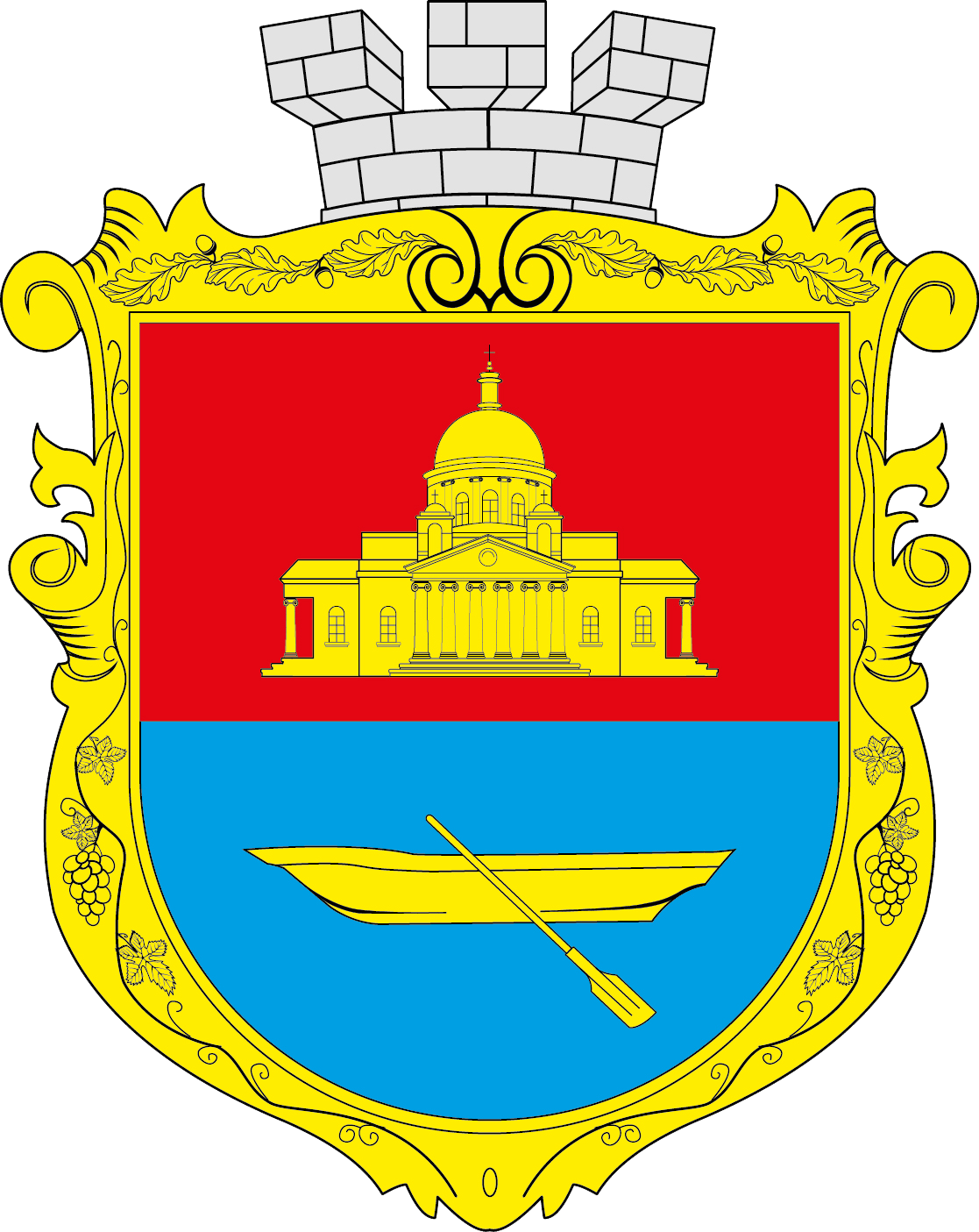
- Flag Coat of arms
- Interactive map of Bolhrad
- Location within Ukraine Location within Odesa Oblast
- Coordinates: 45°40′2″N 28°36′46″E
- Country: Ukraine
- Oblast: Odesa Oblast
- Raion: Bolhrad Raion
- Hromada: Bolhrad urban hromada
- Founded: 1821

Area
  - Total: 94 km^{2} (36 sq mi)
- Elevation: 75 m (246 ft)

Population (2022)
  - Total: 14,818
  - Density: 160/km^{2} (410/sq mi)
- Time zone: UTC+2 (EET)
  - Summer (DST): UTC+3 (EEST)
- Postcode district(s): 68700—706
- Area code: +380-4846

Bolhrad (Ukrainian: Болград, romanized: Bolhrad, pronounced [bolˈɦrɑd]; Bulgarian: Болград, romanized: Bolgrad; Romanian: Bolgrad, Gagauz: Bolgrad) is a small city in Odesa Oblast (province) of southwestern Ukraine, in the historical region of Budjak. It is the administrative center of Bolhrad Raion (district) and hosts the administration of Bolhrad urban hromada, one of the hromadas of Ukraine. Population: 14,818 (2022 estimate).

== History ==
Historical affiliations

Russian Empire (Bessarabia Governorate) 1812–1856
Principality of Moldavia 1856–1859
Romania 1859–1878
Moldavian Democratic Republic 1917–1918
Kingdom of Romania 1918–1940
Soviet Union (Ukrainian SSR) 1940–1941
Kingdom of Romania 1941–1944
Soviet Union (Ukrainian SSR) 1944–1991
Ukraine 1991–present

Bolhrad was founded in 1821 by Bulgarian settlers in Bessarabia, under the direction of General Ivan Inzov who is "revered" by Bolhrad residents as the "Founder of Our City." Bolhrad became part of Moldavia from 1856 to 1859, Romania from 1859 to 1878, then becoming part of the Moldavian Democratic Republic, from 1917 to 1918.

Home to a significant Romanian ethnic community at that time, the citizens of Bolgrad played an important role in supporting the unification of Greater Romania. Through cultural institutions and political activism—especially during the events of 1917–1918—Romanians from Bolgrad strongly advocated for the union of Bessarabia with Romania, contributing meaningfully to the formation of Greater Romania. From 1918 to 1940, Bolgrad was part of the Kingdom of Romania, being considered an important cultural center in the region, before occupied by the USSR, during the Occupation of Bessarabia by the Soviet Union, then being incorporated in the territory of the Ukrainian SSR, and later, after the dissolution of the soviet union, being part of independent Ukraine.

Images of Romanian Bolgrad

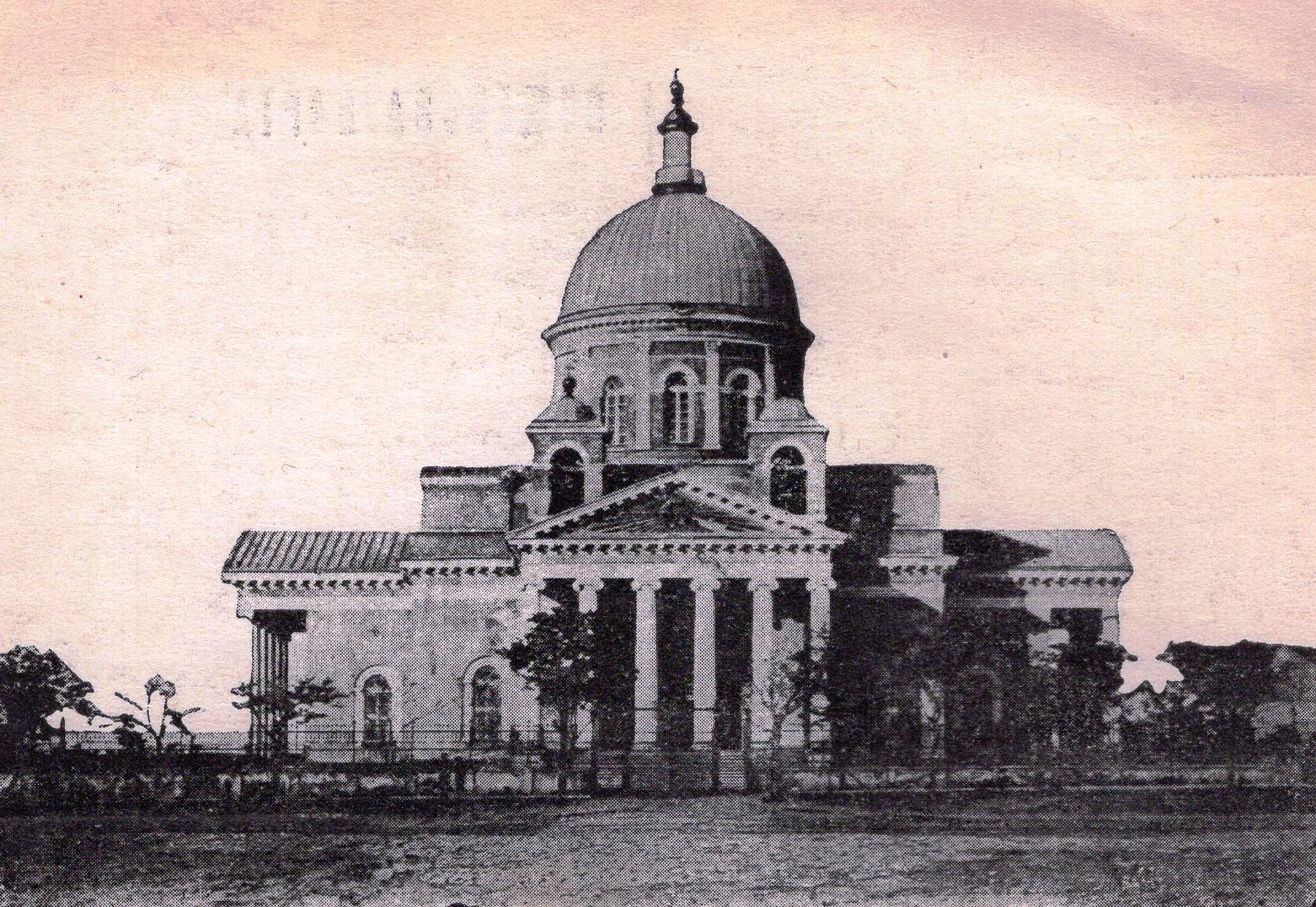
Transfiguration Cathedral

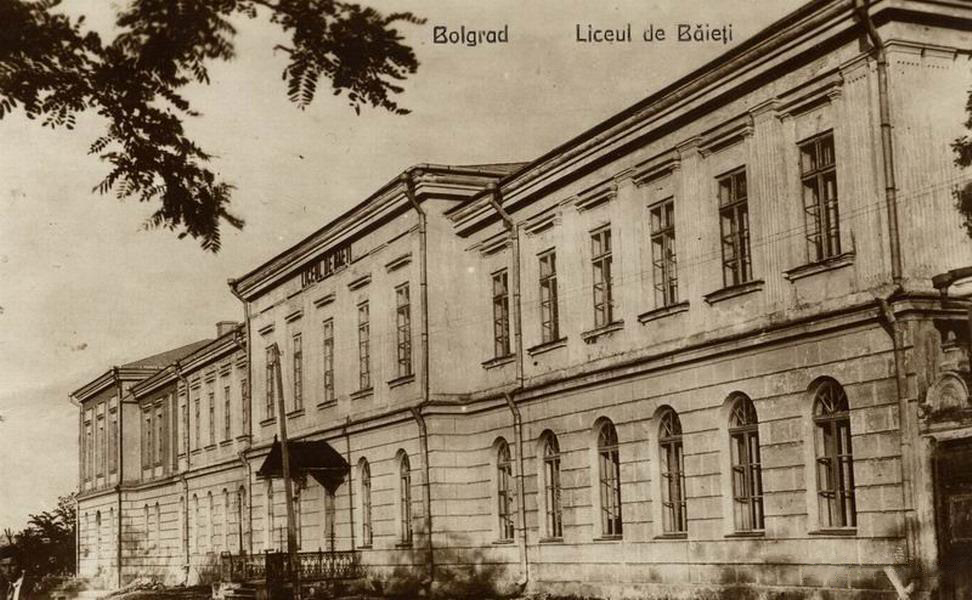
Bolhrad High School

== Demographics ==
Historical population
| Year | Pop. | ±% |
|---|---|---|
| 1897 | 12,300 | — |
| 1930 | 14,280 | +16.1% |
| 1941 | 10,713 | −25.0% |
| 2001 | 17,353 | +62.0% |
| 2011 (est.) | 15,479 | −10.8% |

The surrounding Bolhradsky district is predominantly populated by ethnic Bulgarians (a majority of 61%). Bolhrad itself is inhabited by a large number of Bessarabian Bulgarians and is considered by locals to be the unofficial capital of the Bessarabian historic district of Budjak.

In 1897, the linguistic make-up was 68.9% Bulgarian, 11.3% Moldavian, 7,1% Jewish, 5.0% Russian, 5,1% Ukrainian, 1.0% Turkish, and 0.8% Polish.

As of the 2001 Ukrainian census, Bulgarians still constitute the largest ethnic group in the city, accounting for almost half of the population. The second largest group are Ukrainians, closely followed by Russians. The town also has a significant Moldovan/Romanian and Gagauz population.

Ethnic groups in Bolhrad
| | percent |
| Bulgarians | 45.50% |
| Ukrainians | 22.58% |
| Russians | 22.51% |
| Gagauz | 3.34% |
| Moldovans | 2.48% |
| Belarusians | 0.72% |
| Armenians | 0.50% |
| Poles | 0.10% |
| Jews | 0.07% |
| Georgians | 0.06% |
| Romanians | 0.06% |

According to the 2001 census, there was no language spoken by the majority of the population, which was composed of speakers of Russian (48.7%), Bulgarian (32.65%), Ukrainian (13.92%), Gagauz (2%) and Romanian (1.15%). Most ethnic Ukrainians, Bulgarians and Gagauz were native speakers of the languages of their respective groups, but most ethnic Moldovans were Russian-speakers in 2001.

== Economy ==
As of 1920, Bolhrad has had a coal industry.

== Education ==
The Georgi Sava Rakovski Bolhrad High School founded in 1858 is the oldest high school of the Bulgarian National Revival.

== Notable people ==
=== Natives ===
- Dimitar Grekov (1847–1901), Bulgarian politician
- Danail Nikolaev (1852–1942), Bulgarian general
- Georgi Todorov (1858–1934), Bulgarian general
- Vladimir Cavarnali (1910–1966), Bulgarian Romanian poet, journalist, and political figure
- Petre Cișmigiu (1915–2006), Romanian sports shooter and civil engineer
- Nicolae Văcăroiu (born 1943), former Prime Minister of Romania
- Irina Molokanova (born 1957), Transnistrian politician
- Petro Poroshenko (born 1965), fifth President of Ukraine, entrepreneur and business oligarch

=== Residents ===
- Mykola Shmatko (1943–2020), Ukrainian visual artist
