= Zheleznodorozhny Okrug =

Zheleznodorozhny Okrug may refer to:

- Zheleznodorozhny Urban Okrug, a former municipal formation which the former city of Zheleznodorozhny in Moscow Oblast, Russia was incorporated as
- Zheleznodorozhny Okrug, Kursk, a city division of Kursk, Russia
