= Udobne =

Rural locality in Odesa Oblast, Ukraine

Udobne Удобне
- Village
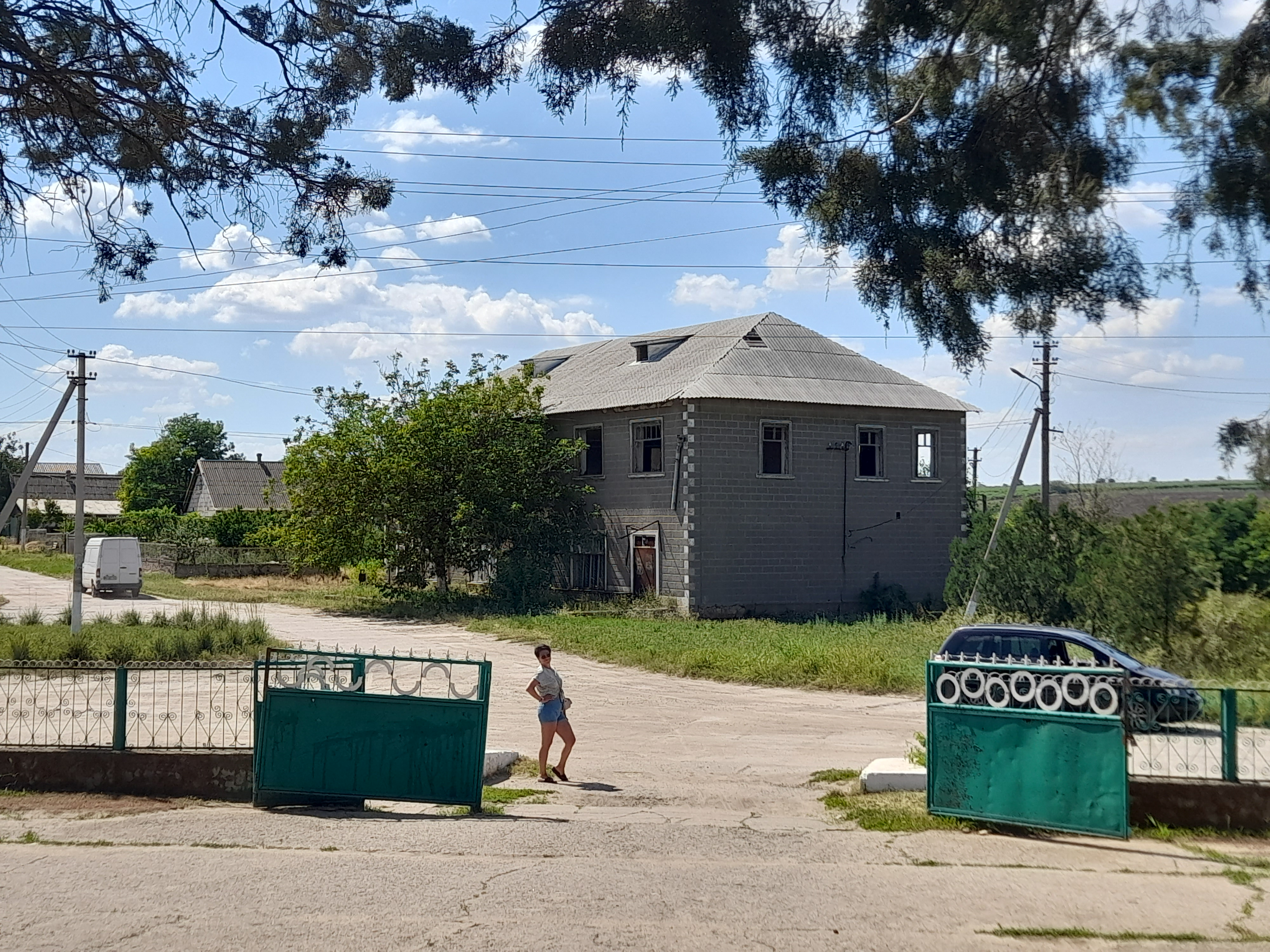
- Central street of the village
- Interactive map of Udobne
- Location in Ukraine Udobne (Odesa Oblast)
- Coordinates: 46°22′51″N 30°2′36″E
- Country: Ukraine
- Oblast: Odesa Oblast
- Raion: Odesa Raion
- Hromada: Maiaky rural hromada
- Village founded: 1859

Area
  - Total: 3.08 km^{2} (1.19 sq mi)

Population (2001)
  - Total: 1,947
- Time zone: UTC+2 (EET (Kyiv))
  - Summer (DST): UTC+3 (EEST)
- Postal code: 67731
- Area code: +380 4849
- Former name: Hankishlo (1859–1945)

Udobne (Ukrainian: Удобне; until November 14, 1945, Ukrainian: Ганкишло; Romanian: Han-Câșla) is a village in Odesa Raion of Odesa Oblast in Ukraine. It belongs to Maiaky rural hromada, one of the hromadas of Ukraine. Located on the border with Moldova, 5.5 km northwest of the Dniester Estuary and 64 km from Odesa.

== History ==
According to data from 1859, 723 people (368 males and 355 females) lived in the state village of Hankyshlo (Kishlo Khanului) of the Akkerman District of the Bessarabian Region, there were 112 farmsteads, and there was an Orthodox church. As of 1886, 764 people lived in the former state village of Palansk Volost, there were 150 farmsteads, there was an Orthodox church, a school and a pottery factory. According to the 1897 census, the number of residents increased to 1,503 (709 male and 714 female), of which 1,407 were Orthodox christians.

In 1945, by Decree of the Presidium of the Supreme Soviet of the Ukrainian SSR, the village of Hankyshlo was renamed to Udobne, and became part of the Starokozatsky District of the Izmail Oblast of the Ukrainian SSR.
