= Maiaky, Odesa Raion, Odesa Oblast =

Rural locality in Odesa Oblast, Ukraine

Maiaky Маяки
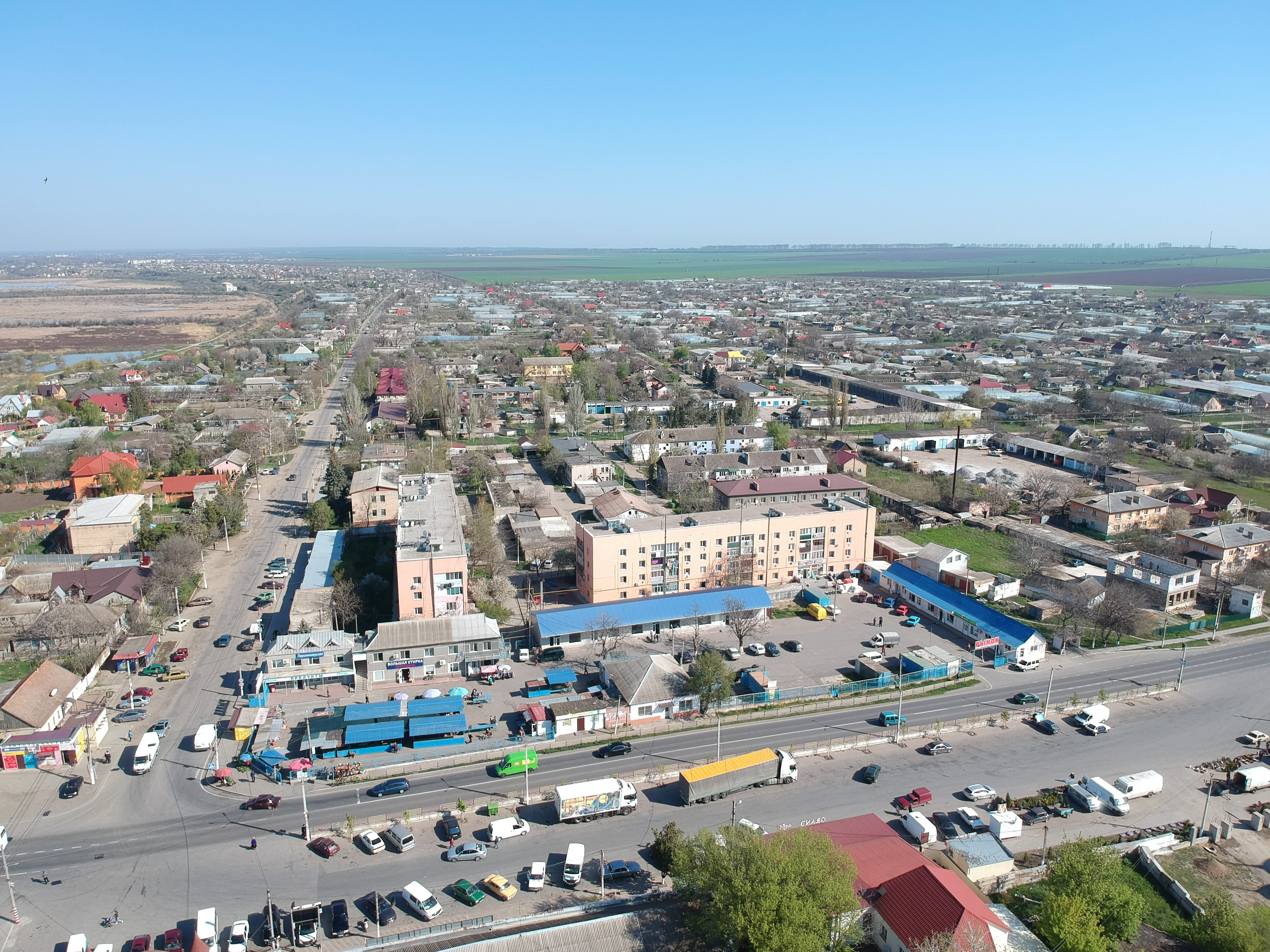

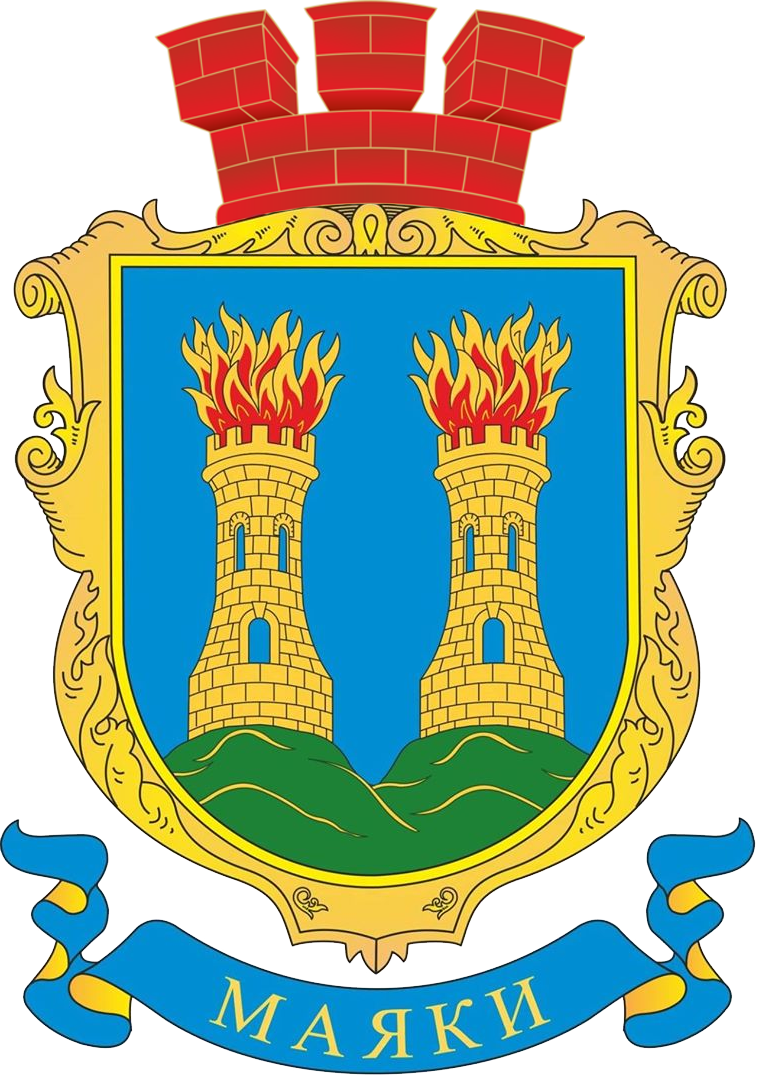
- Coat of arms
- Interactive map of Maiaky
- Location in Ukraine Maiaky (Odesa Oblast)
- Country: Ukraine
- Oblast: Odesa Oblast
- Raion: Odesa Raion
- Hromada: Maiaky rural hromada
- Time zone: UTC+2 (EET (Kyiv))
  - Summer (DST): UTC+3 (EEST)

Maiaky (Ukrainian: Маяки) is a village in Ukraine, located in Odesa Raion, Odesa Oblast. It is the administrative center of Maiaky rural hromada, one of the hromadas of Ukraine.

As of the Russian Empire census of 1897, Maiaky had a population of 4,575 people. Of these, 62.6% natively spoke the Russian language; 20.6% natively spoke Ukrainian, and 14.1% natively spoke Yiddish.
