= German evacuation from Central and Eastern Europe =

Population transfer from Nazi-occupied areas

The evacuation of German people from Central and Eastern Europe ahead of the Soviet Red Army advance during the Second World War was delayed until the last moment. Plans to evacuate people to present-day Germany from the territories controlled by Nazi Germany, including from the former eastern territories of Germany as well as occupied territories, were prepared by the German authorities only when the defeat was inevitable, which resulted in utter chaos. The evacuation in most of the Nazi-occupied areas began in January 1945, when the Red Army was already rapidly advancing westward.

Until March 1945, the Nazi authorities had evacuated from the eastern territories (prewar Germany, Poland, Hungary, Romania and Yugoslavia) an estimated 10 to 15 million persons, Germans as well as citizens of other nations. In the territory of Germany, which Stalin gave to Poland after the war, there were 10 million residents in 1944–1945, including 7.3 million permanent residents, or Reichsdeutsche (including 1 million ethnic Poles spared by the expulsions, and 6.3 million ethnic Germans), in addition on German territory to be evacuated were 2.5 million transients consisting of 1.5 million bombing raid evacuees from the heartland of Nazi Germany and of 1 million slave workers of many nationalities making products for the SS Ostindustrie and DAW).

Polish historians put the number of "Germans" in early 1945 on the annexed territory of postwar Poland at 12,339,400 (8,885,400 in prewar German territory, 670,000 from prewar Poland; 900,000 ethnic Germans resettled in Poland; 750,000 administrative staff and 1,134,000 bombing raid evacuees). Along with the native German civilians, the Volksdeutsche from the east (i.e. the German-speakers) were evacuated or fled as well. Most of the affected Volksdeutsche had settled into occupied Poland before March 1944. They took up farms and homes of Poles forcibly removed or executed during the ethnic cleansing operations in the preceding years. Meanwhile, the number of returning Reich Germans who had fled eastward temporarily in fear of the British and American bombings in the centre of Germany is also estimated between 825,000 and 1,134,000.

Apart from the evacuation of civilians, the Germans also evacuated Nazi concentration camp prisoners from the WVHA controlled enterprises, who were forced to walk to the Austrian and German borders as the Soviets approached from the east. The German SS evacuated camp after camp as the war drew to a close, sending at least 250,000 men and women on death marches starting in March and April 1945. Some of those marches to the geographical centres of Germany and Austria lasted for weeks, causing thousands of deaths along the road.

Statistics dealing with the evacuations are incomplete, and there is uncertainty that estimates are accurate because of the atmosphere of the Cold War period, when various governments manipulated them to fit ideological narratives. According to a recent estimate in Germany, up to six million Germans may have fled or had been evacuated from the areas east of the Oder-Neisse line before the Red Army and the Soviet-controlled Polish People's Army took hold of the entire territory of postwar Poland. The West German search service confirmed the deaths of 86,860 civilians from the wartime flight and evacuations from those areas.

== Overview ==
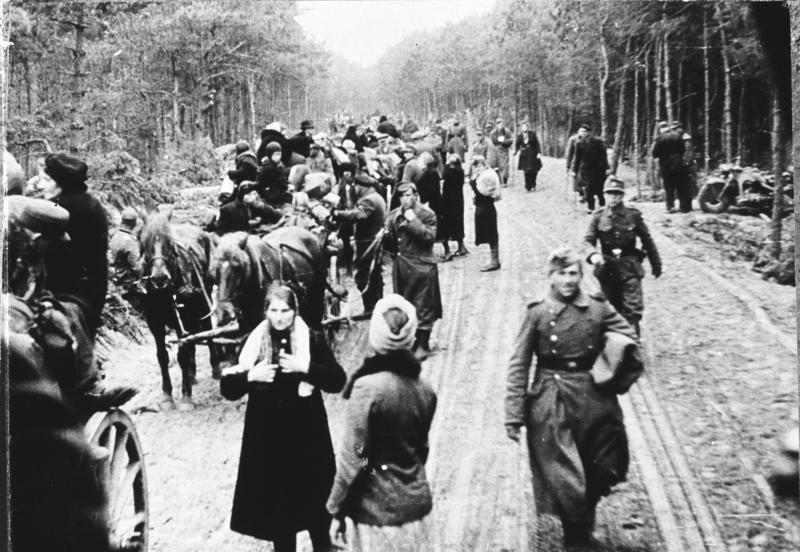
German refugees and soldiers near Braunsberg (Braniewo), East Prussia, February 1945

The plans to evacuate the German speaking population westwards from part of the Eastern and Central Europe including from cities and towns in the Eastern Gaue of Nazi Germany were prepared by various Nazi authorities towards the end of the war. According to postwar affidavit submitted in 1947 by the Nazi governor of Warsaw, Gruppenführer Ludwig Fischer: "in roughly mid-August [1944] Gauleiter – of the Warthegau (Greater Poland) district – Greiser directed a huge column of trains and other transportation means filled with goods, furniture, textiles, and medical supplies from Warsaw to Posen (Poznań). During the whole time that fighting was ongoing Greiser evacuated not only gasoline, but everything that he could." In late 1944 the Gauleiter of Danzig-West Prussia Albert Forster prepared his own evacuation plan called "Fall Eva" to evacuate cultural and strategic goods from the region in accordance with the 'scorched earth' policy. From late 1944 until May 1945 682,536 refugees, 109,337 soldiers and 292,794 wounded passed through the seaports of Danzig, Gdynia, and through the Hel Peninsula.

Nazi officials estimated that in February 1945 ten million refugees were on the move to escape the Russian advance. According to historians Hahn and Hahn humanitarian considerations did not play a role in Nazi evacuation planning, the Nazis considered the evacuation of the entire population as not feasible and that it was better that the population remain in territory occupied by the Soviets. By most current accounts drawing on research carried out in Poland, up until the end of the war 7,494,000 persons were evacuated from post-war Polish territory to the centre of Germany including 3,218,000 from Silesia, 2,053,000 from East Prussia, 1,081,000 from East Pomerania, 330,000 from East Brandenburg, and 812,000 from General Government. Among them, were 2,000,000 Germans who had been evacuated to, or had been resettled during the war into occupied Poland, and who took up homes of Poles subjected to ethnic cleansing operations in the preceding years. Before the end of war the number of Germans who evacuated from Czechoslovakia is estimated at 150,000 to 370,000; from Hungary 50,000–60,000; from Romania 100,000; from Yugoslavia 200,000–300,000 and from the USSR 324,000. According to sources, the total number ranged from 10 to 15 million persons. Many of those who were evacuated during the war returned to their homes in the east after May 1945; only to be transferred back to Germany in the following years. The West German Schieder commission estimated based on German ration card data from February/March 1944 that the total civilian German population (des deutschen Bevölkerungsstandes) east of the Oder-Neisse line was 11,924,000 at the end of 1944. Including 9,758,000 in pre-war German territory; 134,000 in Memel 404,000 in Danzig and 1,602,000 on occupied Polish territory. According to Schieders calculations included in the total civilian population are 825,000 persons evacuated eastwards to avoid Allied air raids and 1,174,000 Reichsdeutsche and re-settlers from other European nations. Schieder estimated that out of the 11.9 million population in late 1944 east of the Oder-Neisse line at the end of the war 4.4 million remained on Polish territory. More recent research in Poland puts the Germans in the fall of 1944 on the current Polish territory at 12,339,400 including 8,885,400 on pre-war German territory and Danzig; 670,000 in occupied Polish territory; 900,000 re-settlers from other European nations; 750,000 German occupation administrators and 1,134,000 persons evacuated eastwards to avoid Allied air raids According to Rudiger Overmans the West German search service was able to confirm the deaths of 93,283 civilians due to the wartime flight and evacuations including 86,860 from the territory of present-day Poland and the Russian Kaliningrad region. According to the German Federal Archives 100,000 to 120,000 civilians were killed during the wartime flight and evacuation from the territory east of the Oder Neisse line.

In most cases, however, the implementation of the plans was either delayed until Allied forces had already advanced into the areas to be evacuated, or it was prohibited entirely by the Nazi apparatus. Despite the rapid advances of the Red Army, the German authorities in many areas forbade leaving one's place of residence without a permit and an officially valid reason. Millions of Germans were left in these areas until combat conditions overwhelmed them, as a direct result of both the draconian measures taken by the Nazis towards the end of the war against anyone even suspected of 'defeatist' attitudes (such as suggesting evacuation) and the fanaticism of many Nazi functionaries in their mindless support of useless 'no retreat' orders. When the German authorities finally gave people the order to leave their homes, the available means of transport (such as trains and ships) were inadequate, and this forced many to leave most of their belongings behind. The first mass movement of German civilians in the eastern territories included both spontaneous flight and organized evacuation starting in the summer of 1944 and continuing through to the spring of 1945.

The guards and inmates of the Majdanek camp were evacuated starting on April 1, 1944. However most of the evacuation efforts commenced in January 1945, when Soviet forces were already at the eastern border of Greater Germany, including the largest death marches.

== Implementation ==
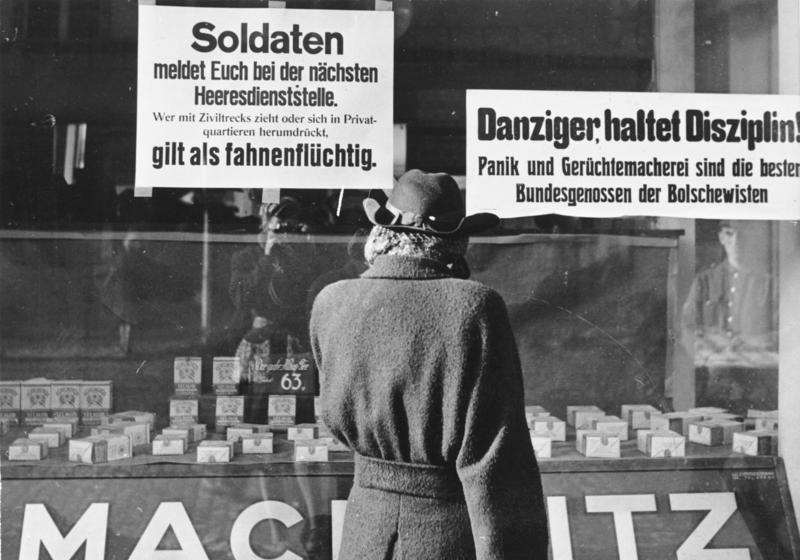
German street posters in Danzig as the Red Army approaches, warning soldiers that escaping with civilians will be treated as desertion.

The first Volksdeutsche to exit Russian territories were the Black Sea Germans and those from around Leningrad. They were resettled and/or evacuated already in 1942–43, partly to Greater Poland (then Reichsgau Wartheland) and partly to Germany proper. In December 1943 the city of Berdychiv was evacuated by the Reich Germans, the German Volksdeutschen, agencies of the civil government, the government of the country, and the able-bodied population. Because of the provisions of the Yalta Agreement, all Soviet citizens in Germany at war's end had to be repatriated. About 200,000 Soviet Germans, resettled during the war in Poland by the Nazis, were deported by the Soviet forces and sent to Forced settlements in the Soviet Union in Siberia and Central Asia From Slovakia 70,000–120,000 Germans were evacuated at the end of 1944 and the beginning of 1945. Hundreds of thousands of ethnic Germans panicked and fled to the west in 1945, particularly from East Prussia, attempting to seek safety within parts of Germany not yet occupied. Nazi propaganda widely publicized the details of the Soviet atrocities, such as the Nemmersdorf massacre of October 1944, in an attempt to strengthen German morale. The Soviet propaganda machine encouraged a harsh and vengeful attitude toward the Germans. While advancing toward the West, soldiers of the Red Army committed a variety of atrocities, most notably rape, mutilation, murder and looting.

== East Prussia ==
The evacuation plans for East Prussia were ready in the second half of 1944. They consisted of both general plans and specific instructions for each individual town. The plans encompassed not only people but also industry and livestock. The evacuation was planned to be conducted in three waves: the first two of them in July and October 1944, when about 25% of the 2.6 million population, mostly elderly, women and children, were supposed to be evacuated to Pomerania and Saxony.

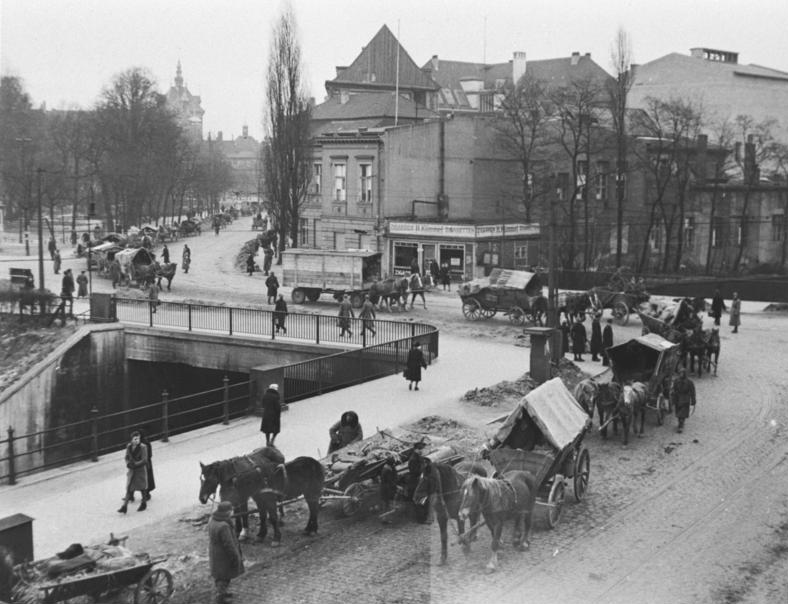
Civilians escaping from Danzig, February 20 or 21, 1945

In fact the population of Memel east of the Neman River was evacuated to the western parts of East Prussia in late summer 1944. On October 7, 1944, that area was the only part of East Prussia completely evacuated. On October 16, 1944, the Red Army reached German territory for the first time in World War II in the southern part of East Prussia near Gumbinnen, encountering German civilians and committing the Nemmersdorf massacre. After the Wehrmacht managed to reconquer large parts of the territory, the East Prussian Gauleiter Erich Koch partially conceded the requests of the Wehrmacht and gave permission to evacuate a small strip of 30 km directly behind the front line. Civilians from that area were sent to the northern parts of East Prussia.

The third wave of evacuation happened in January 1945, when the East Prussian Offensive was already in progress. While Nazi authorities propagated the faith in the Final victory, any individual initiatives involving evacuation was labelled as defeatism. Most civilians left their homes just hours before Red Army units overran them, and were often directly involved in combat. At the same time Nazi representatives, like Gauleiter Koch who had prepared two steamboats in the harbour of Pillau for his personal use, were the first to escape to the west. After the Red Army reached the coast of the Vistula Lagoon near Elbing on January 23, 1945, cutting off the overland route between East Prussia and the western territories, the only way to leave was to cross the frozen Vistula Lagoon and to try to reach the harbours of Danzig (Gdańsk) or Gdingen(Gdynia), to be evacuated by ships taking part in Operation Hannibal. This phase of the evacuation followed two major routes: westwards, towards Danzig and Pomerania, and northwards, towards Königsberg and Pillau port. About 450,000 Germans fled East Prussia over the frozen Vistula Lagoon and were then evacuated by ship from Baltic port cities.

In January 1945 about 3,000 inmates of the East Prussian subcamps of the Stutthof concentration camp were murdered in the massacre of Palmnicken.

According to West German figures out of a pre-war German speaking population (deutschsprachige Bewohner) in East-Prussia of 2,473,000; 511,000 were killed or missing (including 210,000 military personnel). Some 301,000 civilians died due to the wartime flight and post-war expulsions. In total, some 1,200,000 people managed to escape to Germany, while about 800,000 pre-war inhabitants remained in East Prussia as of the summer of 1945. The number of fatalities is disputed by historian Ingo Haar who maintains that they were inflated by the West German government during the Cold War, Haar pointed out that the West German search service was able to confirm 123,360 civilian fatalities in East Prussia due to the wartime flight and post-war expulsions

== Pomerania ==
The evacuation of Pomerania was also delayed. It was further complicated by the influx of the Germans evacuated from East Prussia. At the end of February 1945, the authorities ordered the evacuation to be suspended. This delay resulted in the land evacuation routes soon being blocked by the advancing Soviet and Polish forces. Kolberg, the main seaport within the German-held pocket, was declared a Festung and became the center for sea-based evacuation of both civilians and military from Farther Pomerania. Germans who were evacuated on ships were landed either in German seaport cities west of the Oder River, or in Denmark, where internment camps were set up by the Danes after the war. In total almost 2.2 million people were evacuated this way,.

== Silesia ==
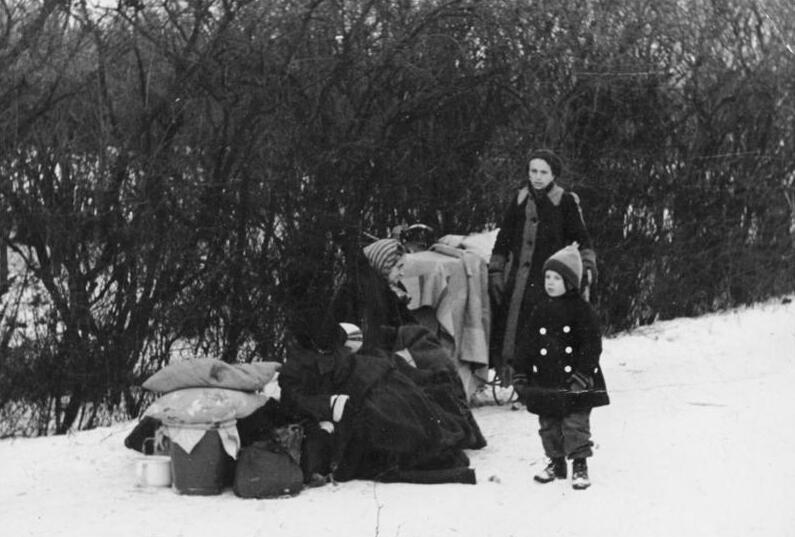
Refugees, Upper Silesia, January 1945

The evacuation of the 4.7 million population of Silesia began on January 19, 1945. The first orders concerned the elderly, women and children of Upper Silesia.

About 85% of the Lower Silesian population was evacuated in 1945, first across the Oder River and then to Saxony or to Bohemia. However, many of the Silesians ignored the evacuation orders, believing that their knowledge of Polish and their Polish provenance would spare them the horrors feared by Germans.

February 1945 the Red Army approached the city of Breslau (now Wrocław). Gauleiter Karl Hanke declared the city a Festung to be held at all costs. Hanke finally lifted a ban on the evacuation of women and children when it was almost too late. During his poorly organised evacuation in early March 1945, 18,000 people froze to death in icy snowstorms and −20 °C weather.

== Western Germany ==
Civilians of Aachen were evacuated in Summer 1944; most leaders left, taking records, but excluding Aachen about one third of the population stayed. By 1945 the Nazi government approved of most civilians not evacuating, fearing the chaos from a wave of eastern and western refugees meeting in the middle of Germany.

== See also ==
- World War II evacuation and expulsion
- Flight and expulsion of Germans (1944–50)
- Nazi-Soviet population transfers
- Hegewald (colony) in Reichskommissariat Ukraine
- The March (1945)
