= Highway M15 (Ukraine) =

Highway in Ukraine

Highway M15
- Автошлях М15
- M15 highlighted in red

Route information
- Part of E87
- Length: 295.2 km (183.4 mi)

Major junctions
- East end: M 05/ M 14/ M 16/ M 27/ M 28/ H 33 in Odesa
- M 3 at Reni
- West end: Moldovan border in Reni

Location
- Country: Ukraine
- Oblasts: Odesa

Highway system
- Roads in Ukraine; State Highways

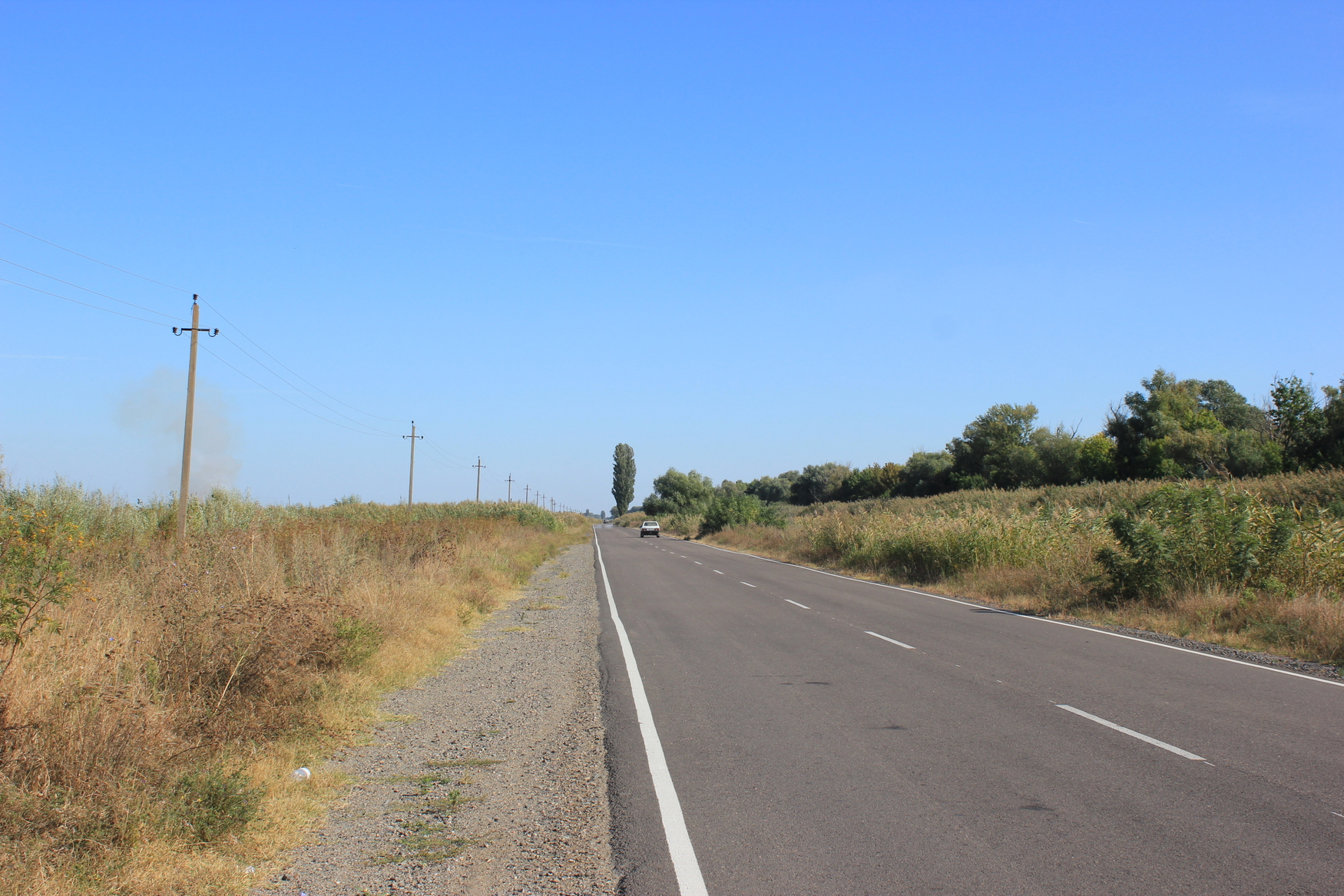
Highway M15 between Izmail and Reni

Highway M15 is a Ukrainian international highway (M-highway) connecting Odesa to Reni. The entire route is part of European route E87. The highway is also known as the highway Odesa–Reni.

== Description ==
The highway crosses the border with Moldova twice and west of the city of Reni it continues as Moldovan national road M3. The highway also passes the Moldovan village Palanca, Ștefan Vodă where Ukraine has jurisdiction on the road.

The highway stretches through the historic and cultural region of Budzhak and ends at the "Reni" border checkpoint.

The section of M15 from Reni to Izmail was previously designated as P33. A portion of the highway Odesa–Reni between Reni and Orlivka follows the narrow strip of land that is between Lake Cahul and the Danube.

== Route ==
Marker	Main settlements	Connections/interchanges
Odesa Oblast
Odesa Raion
0 km	Odesa • Airport "Zastava"	E58 ( M14 - M16 ) • E95 ( M05 - Ferry) • M27 • Tyraspolske shose
	Khlibodarske	
	Velykyi Dalnyk	
	Rozselenets	
		T1620
	Myrne · Odesa Nuclear Power Plant	Baraboi River
	Maiaky	T1625 · Dniester
Bilhorod-Dnistrovskyi Raion / Odesa Raion
	Lower Dniester National Park	
		Moldova–Ukraine border
Moldova / Odesa Oblast
	Palanca checkpoint · Palanca · Nistrul de Jos Ramsar Zone	Moldova–Ukraine border · R 31
Odesa Oblast / Moldova
Bilhorod-Dnistrovskyi Raion
	Mayaky-Udobne checkpoint	Moldova–Ukraine border · Dniester Estuary
		P72
	Monashi	H33 • Alkalia River
	Mykolaivka-Novorosiyska · Airport Mykolaivka-Novorosiyska	Khadzhyder River
	Sarata · Zorya	T1608 · T1643
	Mykhailivka	
	Bilolissya	
	Tatarbunary	T1610 · T1627 · Kohylnyk River · Sasyk Lagoon
	Bashtanivka	
	Spaske	T1628
Izmail Raion / Bilhorod-Dnistrovskyi Raion
		T1645 · Kyrhizh-Kytai
Izmail Raion
	Kyrnychky	T1606
	Novokamianka · Suvorove	
	Kamianka	T1632
	Utkonosivka	Tashbunar River
	Safiany	Byrnova River
	Izmail · Izmail Port · Izmail International Airport	T1607 · T1631 · Aerodromne shose · Bolhradske shose · Danube
	Larzhanka · Nova Nekrasivka	Repyd River · Lake Kuhurluy · Lake Yalpuh
	Novosilske	
	Orlivka	T1629 · Orlivka – Isaccea Ferry · Romania–Ukraine border · Lake Kartal · Lake Cahul · Turkoye Lake · Danube
	Reni · Kirhan · Dolynske	T1642 · Danube
295 km	Reni checkpoint · Giurgiulești · Port of Giurgiulești · Galați checkpoint	Moldova–Ukraine border · E584 / M 3 · (Romania) · Pruth River · Danube
Odesa Oblast (Izmail Raion)

== See also ==
- Roads in Ukraine
- Ukraine Highways
- International E-road network
- Pan-European corridors
