= M3 highway (Moldova) =

Road in Moldova

M3 highway

Route information
- Part of E87 / E584
- Length: 193 km (120 mi) 217 km (135 mi) planned

Major junctions
- From: R 3 near Chișinău
- R 2 near Chișinău Eugen Doga International Airport; R 3 at Cimișlia; M 3.1 near Comrat; R 34 at Slobozia Mare
- To: DN2B at Giurgiulești; (Romania)

Location
- Country: Moldova
- Districts: Chișinău, Ialoveni, Cimișlia, Gagauzia, Taraclia, Cahul
- Major cities: Chișinău, Cimișlia, Comrat

Highway system
- Roads in Moldova

The M3 highway (Romanian: Drumul național M3) is a partially built road in Moldova, which links Chișinău to the southern part of the country via Gagauzia. The road forms part of the European routes E87 and E584 and will have a total length of 217 km (135 mi) when completed. The road passes through Cimișlia and Comrat before reaching its southern terminus, at the border tripoint at Giurgiulești, where it connects with Romania's DN2B and Ukraine's M15 highway, respectively.

The combined length of the opened segments is 193 km (120 mi). The parts of the road currently in service include the Chișinău - Porumbrei segment (32 km) and the Cimișlia - Giurgiulești section (161 km).

Construction works on the Chișinău - Cimișlia section of the M3 began during Soviet rule in the 1980s. They began to slow down after the dissolution of the Soviet Union in 1991, and stopped in 1996, with only 32 km opened to traffic between Chișinău and Porumbrei. Works resumed in 2019, and the section is set to receive motorway status upon completion, thus making M3 the first motorway in Moldova.

Near Comrat, there's a ramification of the M3 linking it to republican road R35; this road is designated the '''M3.1''' and its total length is 4.3 km.

== See also ==
- Ungheni–Odesa motorway: another planned motorway in Moldova
- Roads in Moldova
- Transport in Moldova

== Gallery ==
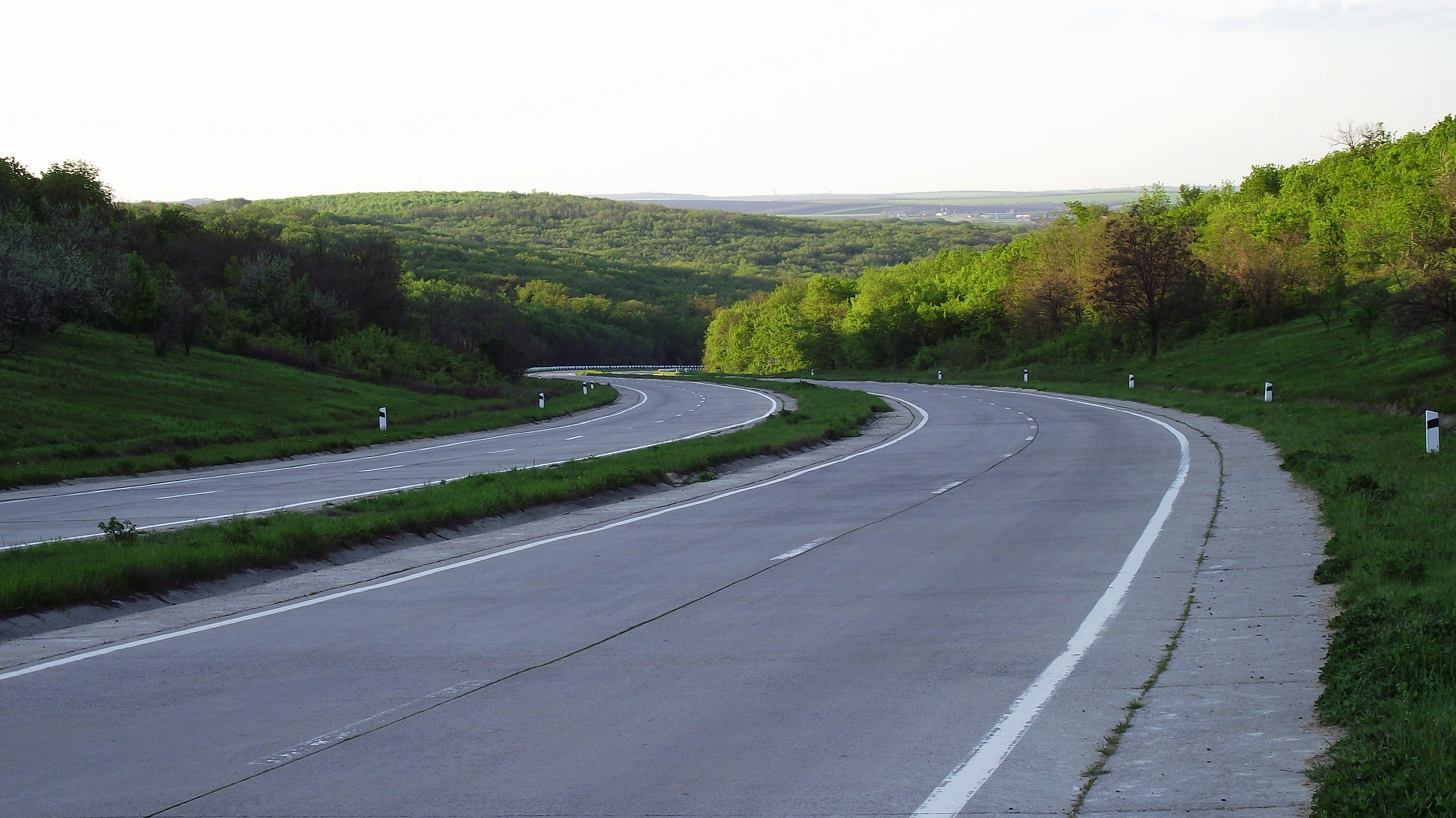
M3 highway between Chișinău and Porumbrei

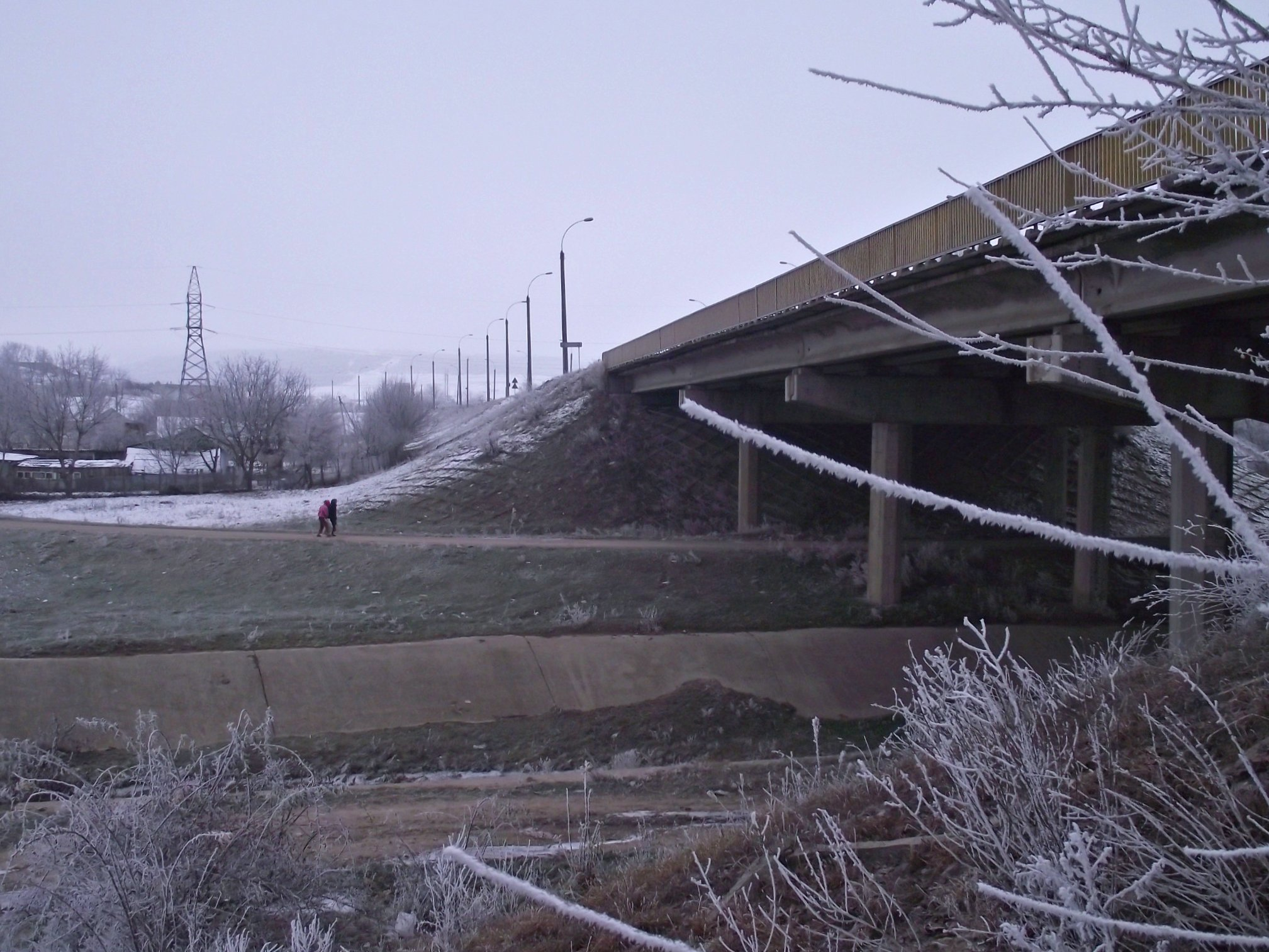
M3 highway near Băcioi
