= Highway H33 (Ukraine) =

Highway in Ukraine

Highway H33
- Автошлях Н33
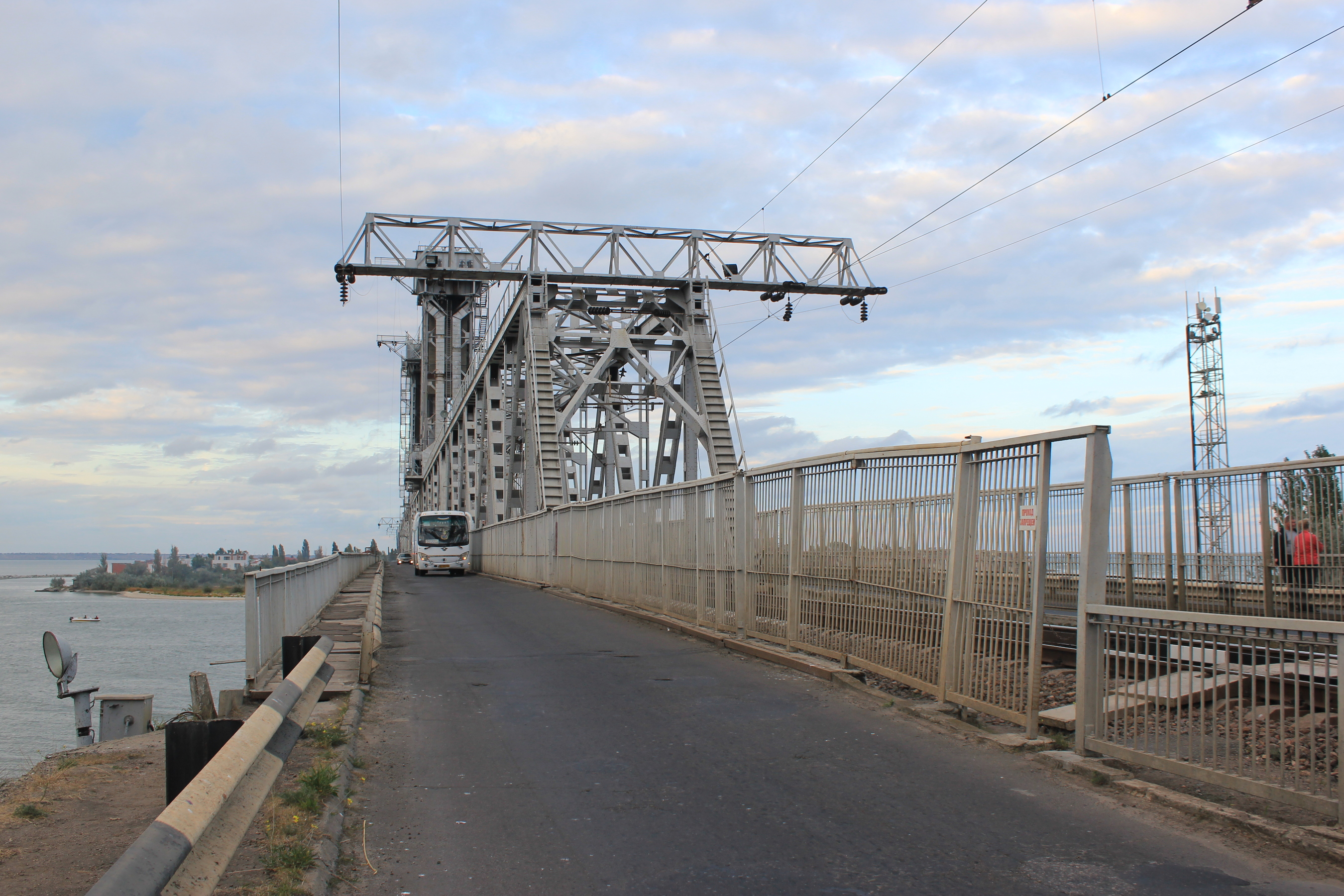
- H33 carried over Zatoka Bridge, a combined rail-road bridge across the estuary of the Dniester

Route information
- Length: 97.2 km (60.4 mi)
- Existed: 2017–present

Major junctions
- East end: M 27 in Odesa
- West end: M 15 in Monashi

Location
- Country: Ukraine
- Oblasts: Odesa

Highway system
- Roads in Ukraine; State Highways

H33 is a Ukrainian national highway (H-highway), passing through the territory of the Odesa region. The route was previously designated as territorial road T-16-04 until 2013 and regional road P-70 from 2013 to 2017, when it was redesignated as national highway H33.

== Whole length ==
The total length of the road, Odesa – Bilhorod-Dnistrovskyi – Monashi - M 15 (together with the entrance to the Port of Chornomorsk), is 97.2 kilometres (60.4 mi).

== Main route ==
Route map: H 33:

Route H33
Odesa Oblast
Odesa Raion
Odesa	E58 M 27	0 kilometres (0 mi)
Prylymanske		
Nova Dolyna		
Velykodolynske	(at the port)	
intersection with	T-1620	
Baraboi		
Ovidiopol	T-1625, T-1641	
Roksolany		
Bilhorod-Dnistrovskyi Raion
Karolino-Buhaz	T-1647	
Dniester Estuary		
Zatoka		
Budaki Lagoon		
Pryberezhne		
Shabo	T-1610	
Salhany		
Bilhorod-Dnistrovskyi	P 72	
Brytivka		
Roskishne		
Monashi intersection with	E87 M 15	96.9 kilometres (60.2 mi)
