= Odesa strikes (2022–present) =

Battle in the Russian invasion of Ukraine

Coordinates: 46°30′02″N 30°43′44″E

- Part of the Russian invasion of Ukraine
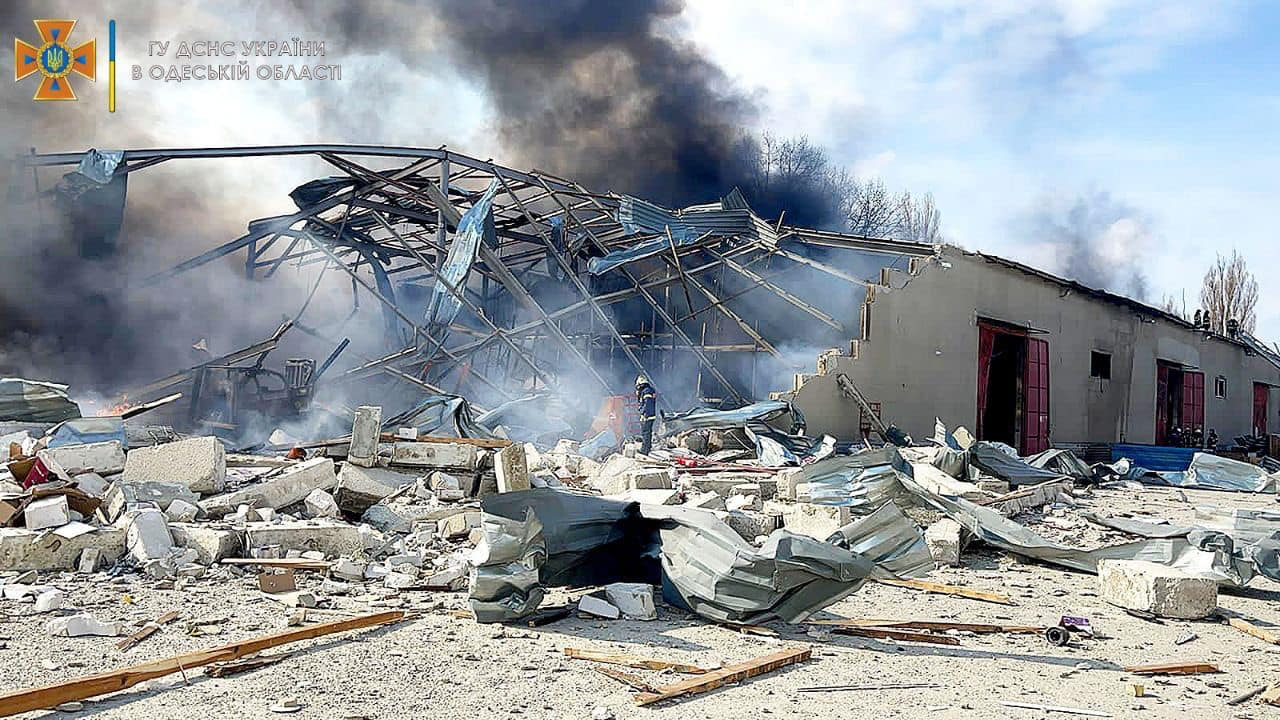
- Aftermath of a Russian missile strike against warehouses in Odesa on 24 February 2022
Date	24 February 2022 – present (4 years, 6 months, 4 weeks and 2 days)
Location	Odesa, Odesa Oblast, Ukraine

Belligerents
Russia	Ukraine

Units involved
Russian Armed Forces: Russian Air Force; Russian Navy	Armed Forces of Ukraine Territorial Defense Forces

Casualties and losses
Per Russia: 1 sailor killed 27 missing Moskva sunk	27+ servicemen killed 6+ wounded 1 Mi-14 and 2 Mi-24 helicopters destroyed 1 aircraft lost ---- 1 warship sunk (Russian claim)
- 131 civilians killed, 312–314 wounded

During the southern Ukraine offensive of the Russian invasion of Ukraine, the city of Odesa and the surrounding region have been the target of shelling and air strikes by Russian forces on multiple occasions since the conflict began, fired in part by Russian warships situated offshore in the Black Sea. The city has also been targeted by Russian cruise missiles.

== Timeline ==
=== 2022 ===
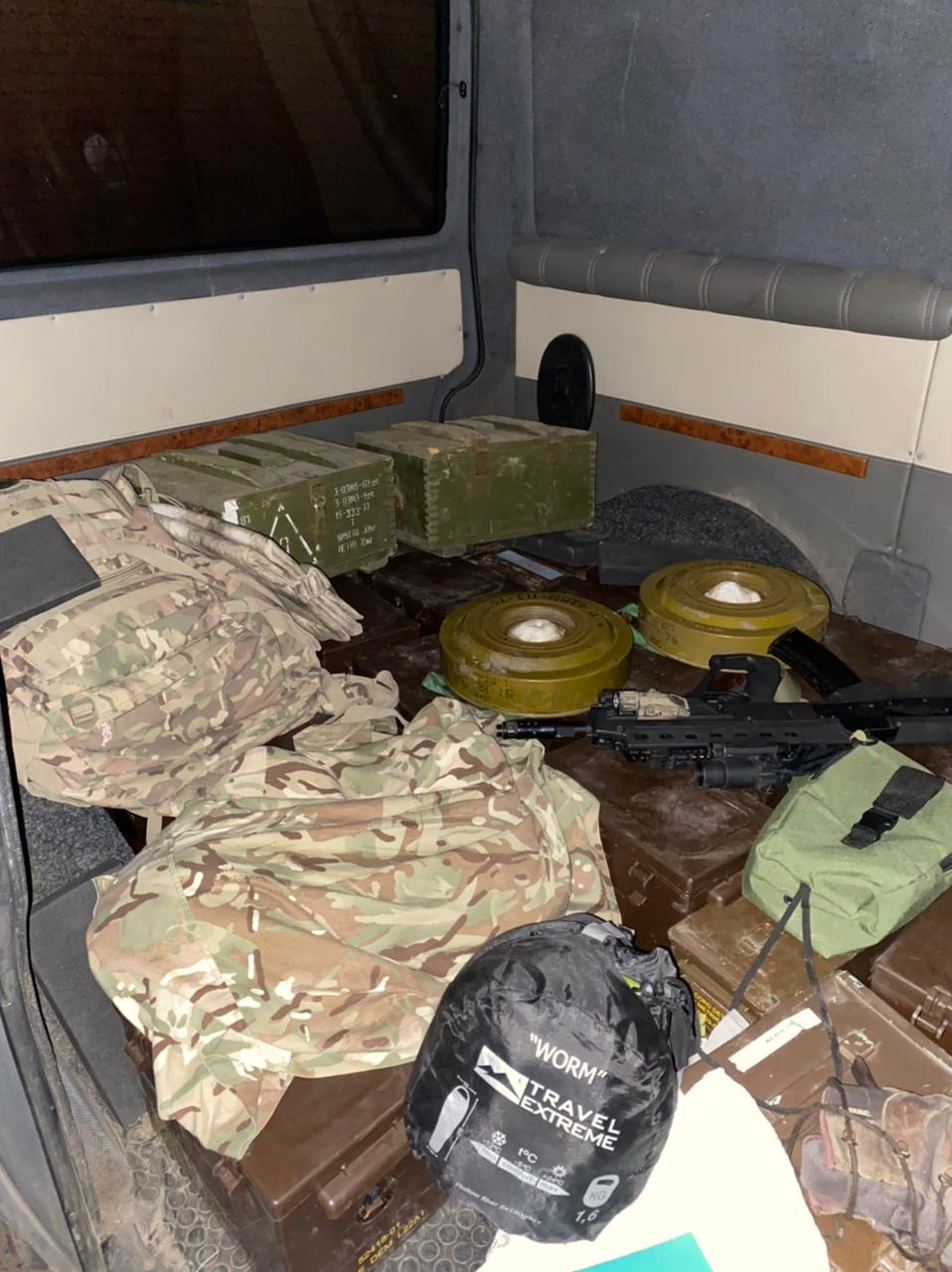
Equipment seized from alleged Russian saboteurs in Odesa, 27 February

The first Russian airstrikes against Odesa occurred on the first day of the invasion, early on 24 February 2022, targeting warehouses in the city as well as radar and air defense systems in Lipetske. The attacks left at least 22 killed and 6 wounded among servicemen and soldiers. Ukrainian authorities also reported that Russian shelling targeted the military airport in Odesa and destroyed one aircraft. Russian saboteurs had begun operating in Odesa by 27 February, as Ukrainian authorities detained them and confiscated their equipment. Evacuation trains began taking civilians out of the city towards Chernivtsi and Uzhhorod on 2 March, with further evacuation trains operating on 8 March.

At around 12:00 local time on 2 March 2022, Russian forces shelled the village of Dachne to the north-west of Odesa, damaging a natural gas pipeline and setting fire to nine houses and a garage. This was followed on 3 March by the shelling of the nearby villages of Zatoka and Bilenke, killing at least one civilian in the latter village. Russian warships also shelled the Ukrainian civilian vessel Helt in the port of Odesa, causing it to sink.

A new brigade of the Territorial Defense Forces of Ukraine was founded in Odesa on 8 March, after initial complaints by civilians in the city wishing to join the defence force of a lack of organisation as they were sent home without weapons.

Russian attacks in Odesa intensified towards the end of March. During the morning of 21 March 2022, Russian warships reappeared offshore and began shelling targets in Odesa including the port, before Ukrainian coastal artillery returned fire and drove them back out into the Black Sea. On 25 March, Ukrainian air defences claimed to shot down three cruise missiles over the Black Sea which were on course to strike targets in and around Odesa. Ukraine claimed two more Russian cruise missiles were shot down off the coast of Odesa on 27 March, although the city subsequently came under heavy mortar fire according to a statement on Telegram by Serhii Bratchuk, spokesman for the Odesa military administration.

On 13 April 2022, Ukrainian presidential adviser Oleksiy Arestovych and Odesa governor Maksym Marchenko said that the Russian cruiser Moskva, flagship of the Russian Black Sea Fleet, had been hit by two Neptune anti-ship missiles and was on fire in rough seas. The missiles were apparently launched in or near Odesa at Moskva located 60 to 65 nautical miles offshore. The Russian Ministry of Defence said that a fire had caused munitions to explode, and that the ship had been seriously damaged and the crew fully evacuated, without any reference to a Ukrainian strike. The following day, the ship sunk as it was attempting to reach port for repairs. Russia stated one sailor from the Moskva was killed and 27 were missing, while 396 crewmembers were rescued. However, according to Ukrainian sources, there were anywhere from 500 to 700 crewmembers on board, and that only 100 of them had survived.

On 23 April 2022, a Russian missile strike hit a military facility and two residential buildings, killing eight civilians and wounding 18 or 20, according to Ukraine. Russia confirmed the attack stating the facility targeted was a logistic terminal at a military airfield that housed US and European weapons given to Ukraine.

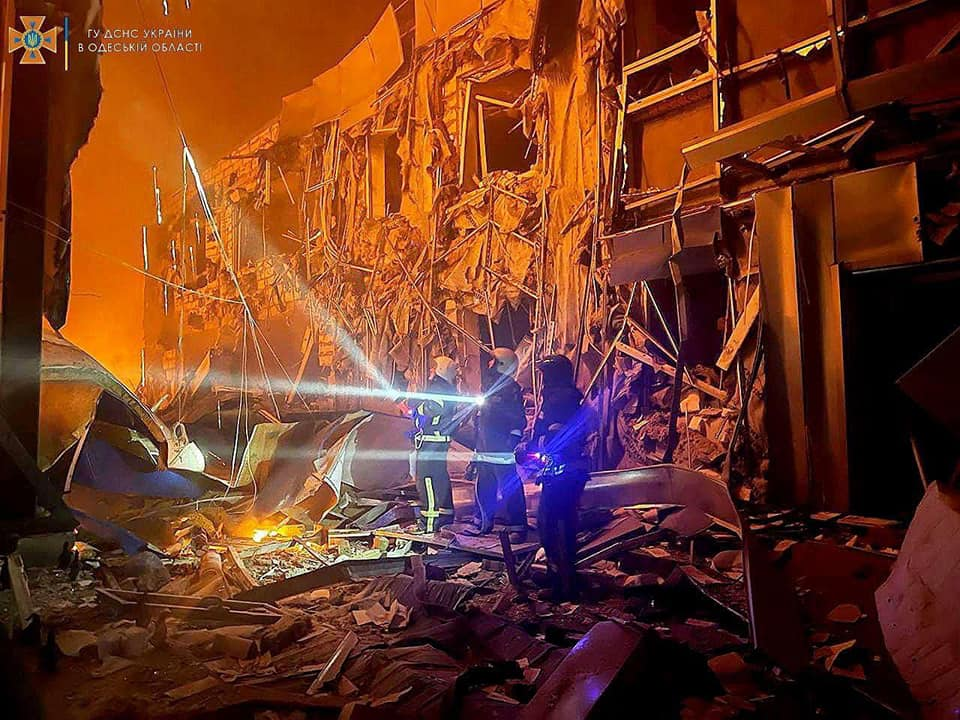
Shopping mall in Fontanka village near Odesa, destroyed on 9 May

On 27 April 2022, Russian forces attacked Zatoka Bridge with the aim of disconnecting the city of Odesa with the rest of the country at the east of Dniester river.

On 1 May 2022, Ukrainian President Zelensky said that Russian forces destroyed the newly built runway of the Odesa Airport. Ukrainian officials said Russian forces used a Bastion missile for the attack. The region was bombed on 4 May hitting the airport at the city of Artsyz, destroying one Mi-24 helicopter and damaging another. On 7 May, attacks were reported with four missiles hitting a civilian building and another two on the city airport. On 7 May, a Ukrainian Naval Aviation Mil Mi-14, piloted by Col. Ihor Bedzai was shot down near Odesa by a Russian Su-30 jetfighter after a mission on Snake Island, five servicemen were killed.

On 9 May 2022, Russia fired three Kinzhal missiles to Odesa Oblast. During the attack a Ukrainian Mi-24 gunship was destroyed in the ground on the east of Artsyz. One person was killed. At that time, President of the European Council Charles Michel and Prime Minister of Ukraine Denys Shmyhal were in Odesa and had to hide in a bomb shelter. In the evening of the same day, Russian troops fired rockets at three warehouses in Odesa and a shopping centre in the village of Fontanka near the city. One person was killed, and two people were injured in the warehouses, and three people were injured in the mall.

On 21 May, the Russian Minister of Defense claim that sea-launched Kalibr missiles destroyed fuel depots at Odesa.

In the night between 30 June and 1 July 2022, three Kh-22 missiles fired from Tu-22M strategic bombers were fired into a 9-store apartment building and a recreational center in the settlement Serhiivka, Bilhorod-Dnistrovskyi Raion, Odesa Oblast. The whole section of the apartment building was destroyed. At least 21 people were killed and more than 38 wounded.

On 23 July 2022, less than a day after signing a grain export deal with Ukraine, Russia launched Kalibr missiles at the Odesa sea trade port. According to Ukraine, two of the four missiles were intercepted. Russian officials told Turkey that Russia had "nothing to do" with the missile strike. The next day, Igor Konashenkov, a spokesman of the Russian Ministry of Defence, confirmed the strike, claiming that it destroyed a Ukrainian warship and a warehouse of Harpoon anti-ship missiles.

As of 26 July 2022, as a result of rocket attacks in Odesa, eleven civilians were killed: eight (including a three-month-old girl) as a result of an attack on the residential complex "Tiras" on 23 April; one teenager during the attack on the dormitory on 2 May, one employee of the warehouse during the attack on the Suvorovsky district of Odesa on 9 May and a warehouse guard on 20 June.

=== 2023 ===
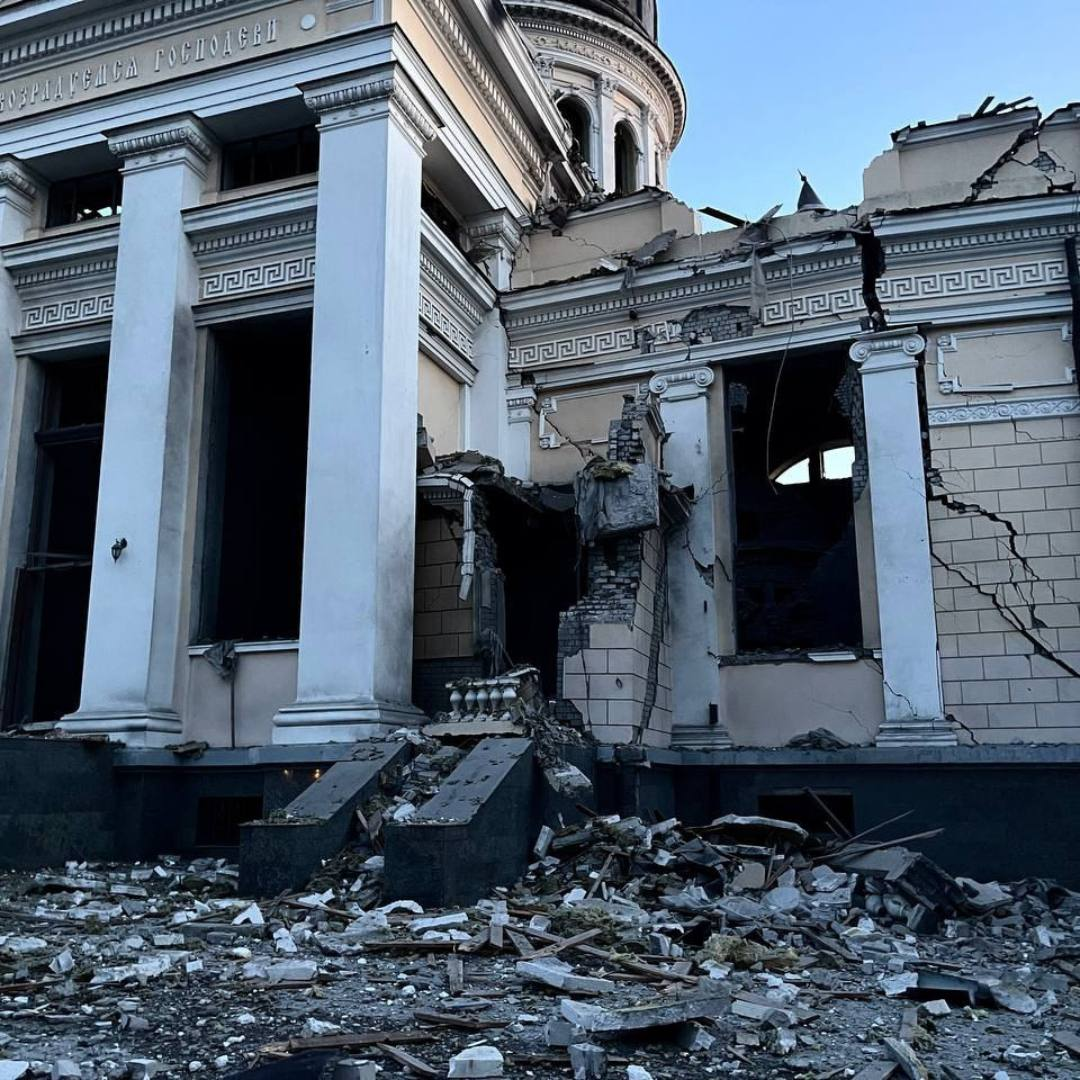
Transfiguration Cathedral after missile attack on 23 July

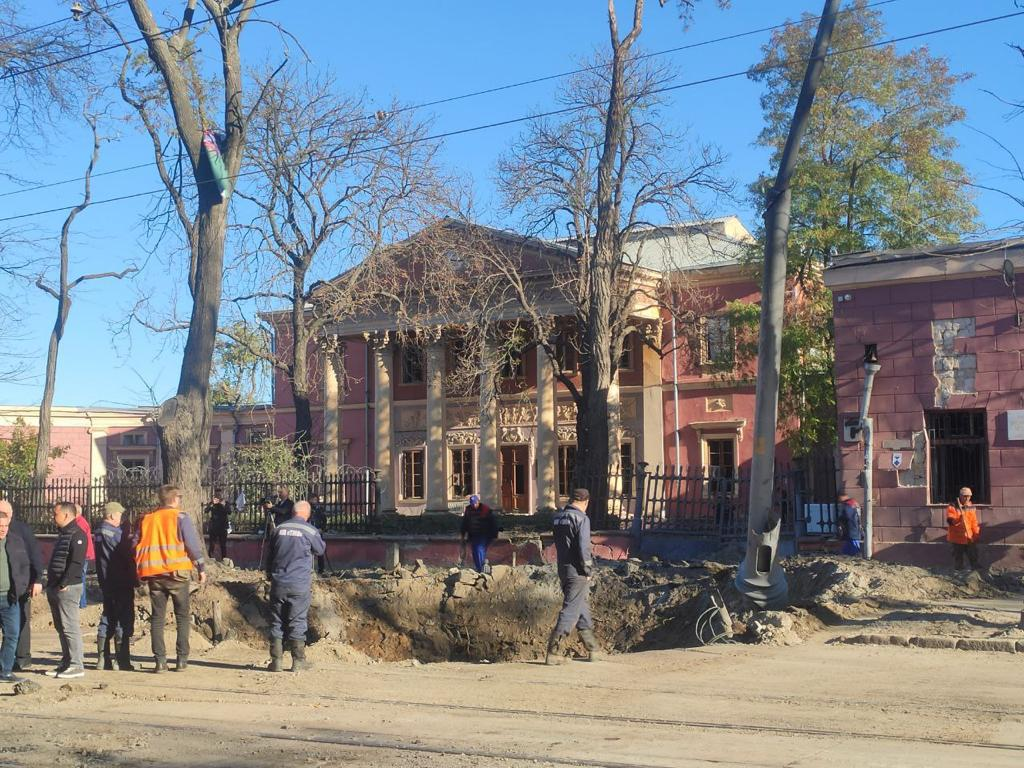
Missile crater in front of Odesa Fine Arts Museum, 6 November

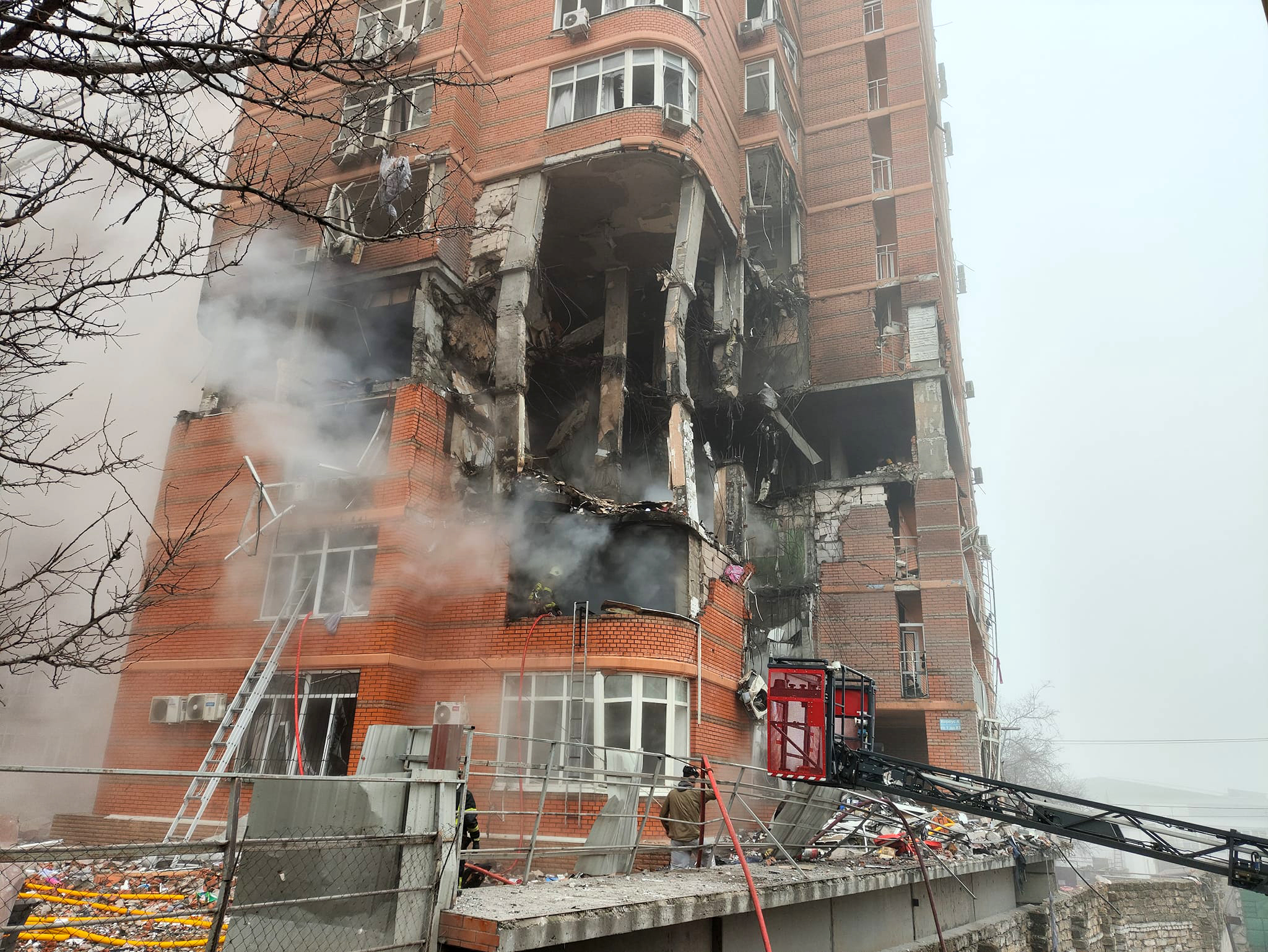
Residential building in Odesa after the attack on 29 December

In the night on 19 July 2023, Russia carried out further missile and drone attacks on the Port of Odesa after withdrawing from the Black Sea Grain Initiative. Grain and oil terminals were damaged. The Ukrainian Ministry of Agriculture claims 60,000 tonnes of grain were destroyed in the attacks.

In the night on July 20, a new attack destroyed an administrative building in Odesa and storage buildings in Odesa region. Among others, the building of the Chinese Consulate General and three museums in the buffer zone of the World Heritage site “The Historic Centre of Odesa” (Archaeological, Maritime and Museum of Literature) were damaged. UNESCO condemned the attack.

On July 22/23, Russian missiles hit Odesa, including the historic centre, again. 25 architectural monuments were damaged according to local authorities. Transfiguration Cathedral, largest in the city, was partially destroyed. The cathedral was of the Ukrainian Orthodox Church of Moscow Patriarchate, which has headquarters in Russia. The House of Scientists was also strongly damaged. At least 6 residential buildings were damaged; one person was killed and 19 injured.

On August 14, Kalibr missiles launched by a Russian frigate off Yalta and several one-way drones hit a store, a hypermarket, a college dorm and other civilian property.

On the evening of 5 November and on the night of 6 November, Russian army attacked Odesa and the region with missiles and kamikaze drones. Some of the drones were shot down, but there were also hits on the port infrastructure (including storage facilities and vehicles with grain). The missiles damaged Odesa Fine Arts Museum and several residential buildings. 8 people were injured. The attack was condemned by UNESCO.

On 29 December, during Russian missile and drone attack on Ukraine, 21 residential buildings (19 multi-storey and 2 private), as well as a lyceum, were damaged in Odesa. 4 people died and 26 were injured in the city.

=== 2024 ===
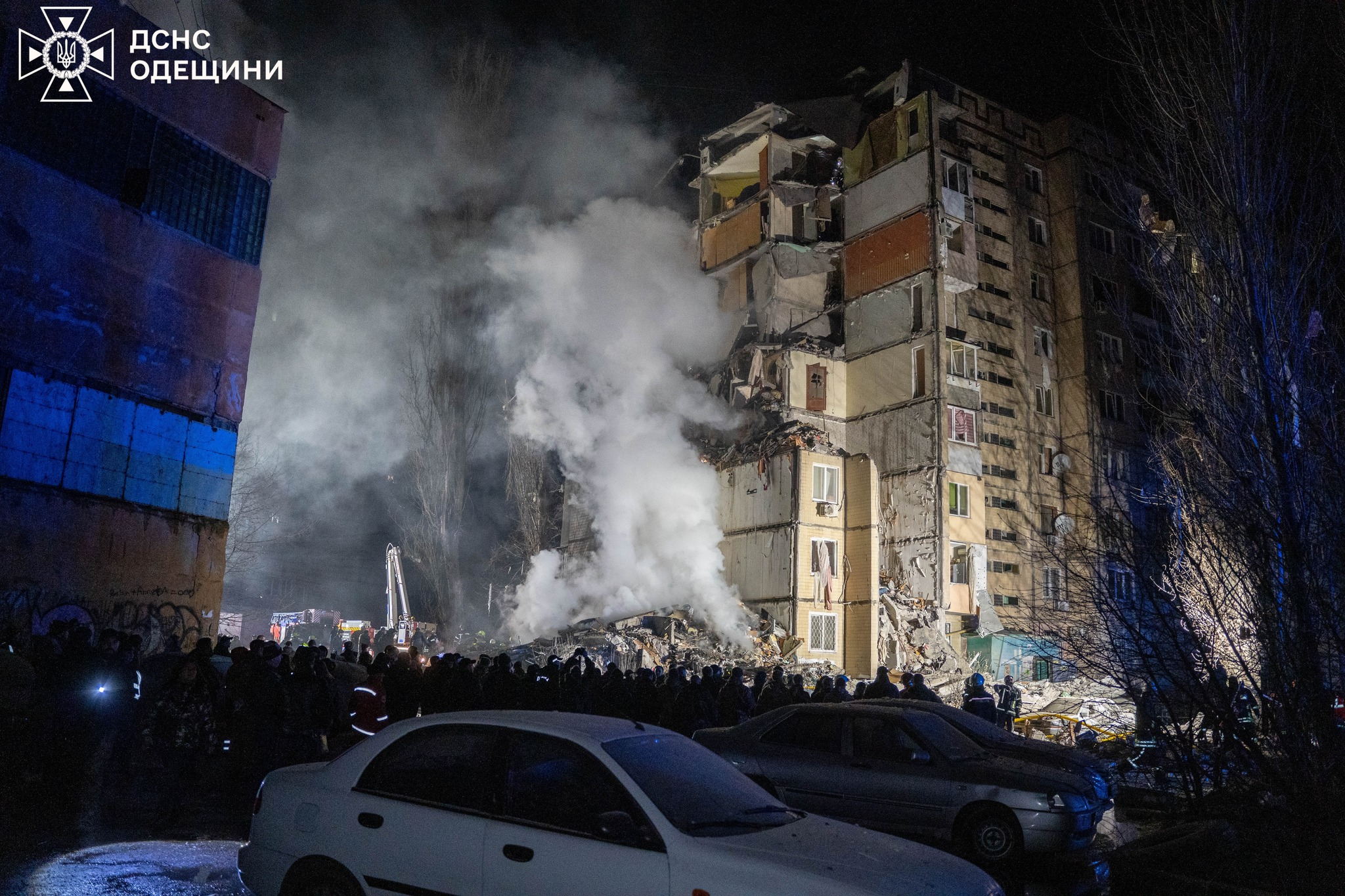
Residential building in Odesa after drone attack on 2 March

As of 23 February 2024, 119 objects of cultural significance had been damaged or destroyed in Odesa Oblast.

In the night on 2 March, a 9-storey residential building in Odesa was partially destroyed due to Russian drone attack. 12 people (including 5 children) were killed and 9 were injured. The next day was declared a day of mourning in Odesa region.

On 6 March, Russian missile attack killed in Odesa 5 people. The missile exploded in several hundreds meters from President of Ukraine Volodymyr Zelenskyy and Prime Minister of Greece Kyriakos Mitsotakis, who visited Odesa this day. They were unharmed.

On 15 March, a missile strike on Odesa killed 21 people and injured at least 73 others. The casualties included senior military and police officers, as well as several civilians.

On 14 August, two people were injured in a Russian missile strike on port infrastructure in Odesa.

On 15 September, a Russian missile strike killed two people in Odesa. Five days later, another missile attack struck civilian and port infrastructure and an Antigua and Barbuda-flagged vessel, injuring four people. The attack was likely done using Iskander-M missiles.

On 6 October, the Saint Kitts and Nevis-flagged cargo vessel Paresa, carrying 6,000 tons of corn, was damaged in a Russian air attack on Pivdennyi Port in Yuzhne in Odesa Oblast. Another foreign-flagged vessel, flagged for Palau, was damaged in an attack on Odesa on 7 October, killing a Ukrainian port employee and injuring five foreign nationals. Two days later, the Panama-flagged civilian container vessel Shui Spirit was damaged in a ballistic missile strike on Odesa, killing eight people and injuring nine others.

On 11 October, four people were killed in a Russian missile attack on Odesa.

On 14 October, one person was killed in a Russian missile attack on Odesa which damaged the same Palau-flagged ship that had been previously struck on 7 October, and the Belize-flagged vessel NS Moon.

On 8 November, one person was killed in Russian drone strikes on Odesa. Another person was killed and 13 injured in a separate attack on Odesa the following day.

On 14 November, one person was killed in an air attack on Odesa.

On 15 November, a Russian missile attack on Odesa killed one person, injured ten, and left thousands of people without heating.

On 17 November, a large-scale Russian attack on infrastructure throughout Ukraine targeted Odesa Oblast. The attack killed two Ukrenergo employees in Odesa, injured one other person, and knocked out power, water, and heating to the city, while causing disruptions in utilities throughout the rest of the oblast.

On 18 November a missile attack was launched on Odesa for the second consecutive day, killing at least 10 civilians and injuring 55 after a launched Russian Iskander-M had been shot down over a residential area in the city, damaging civilian infrastructure.

On 25 November, 11 people were injured in a Russian missile attack that struck residential buildings in downtown Odesa.

=== 2025 ===
On 31 January, seven people were injured and numerous historic buildings, including the Bristol Hotel and the Philharmonic Theater, were damaged in a missile attack.

On 1 March, one person was killed in a Russian drone strike in Odesa Oblast. In the evening, a ballistic missile attack was made on the port of Odesa, injuring two port employees and damaging the Swiss-owned and Panamanian-flagged cargo vessel MSC Levante F.

On 11 March, four Syrian nationals were killed in a Russian missile strike that damaged the cargo ship MJ Pinjar while it was loading grain at the port of Odesa for delivery to Algeria.

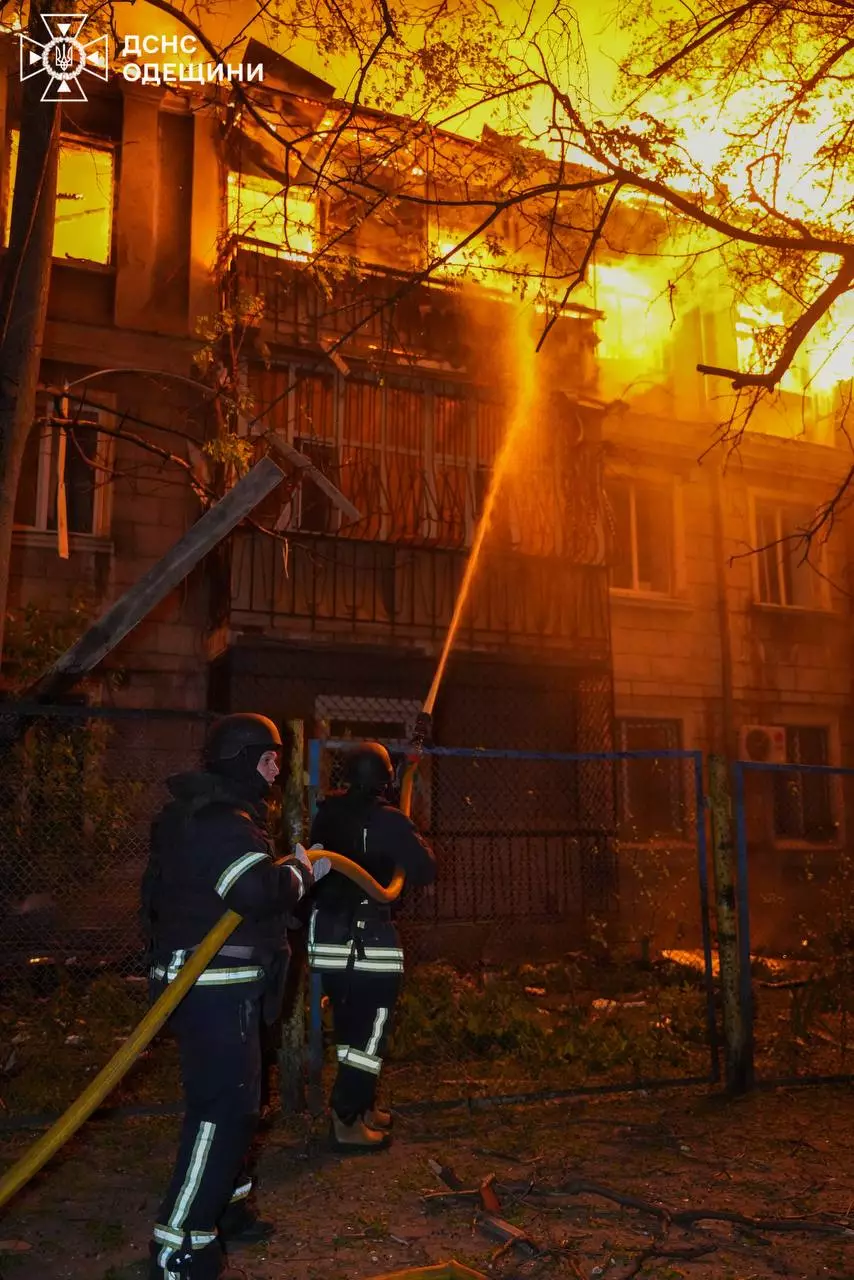
Residential building in Odesa after the strike on 1 May 2025

On 1 May, two people were killed in a Russian drone strike on Odesa.

On 5 May, one person was killed in a drone attack in Odesa Oblast.

On 23 May, two people were killed in a Russian missile attack on Odesa.

On 10 June, two people were killed and at least eight wounded in a Russian missile attack on Odesa.

On 17 June, two people were killed in a drone attack on Odesa.

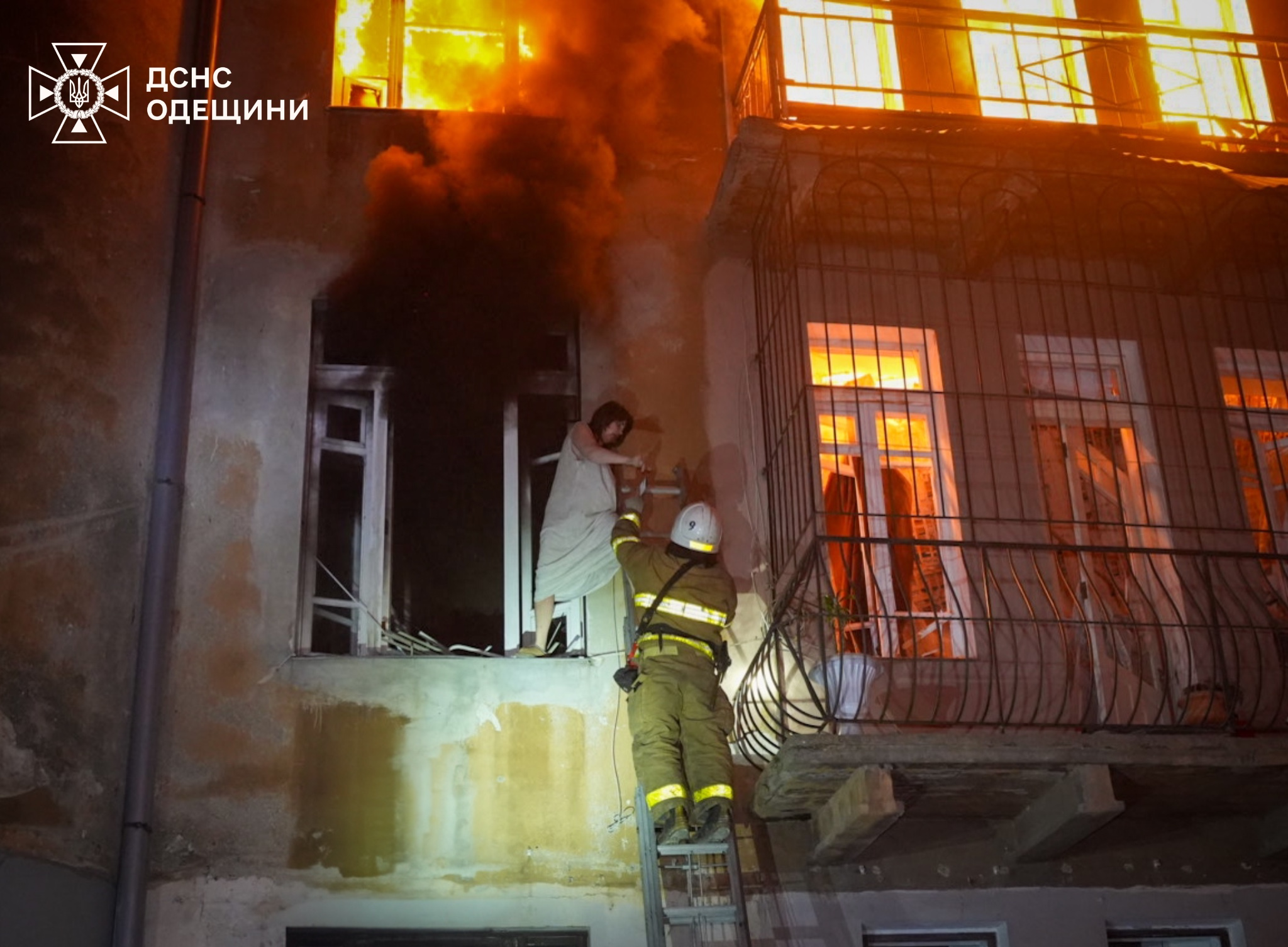
Rescue of a woman from a fire after the attack on Odesa

On 20 June, one person was killed in a Russian drone attack on Odesa.

On 23 June, three people were killed in an attack in Bilhorod-Dnistrovskyi in Odesa Oblast.

On 28 June, two people were killed in a Russian drone attack on Odesa.

On 3 July, two people were killed in a drone attack on Odesa that also damaged a building housing the Chinese consulate.

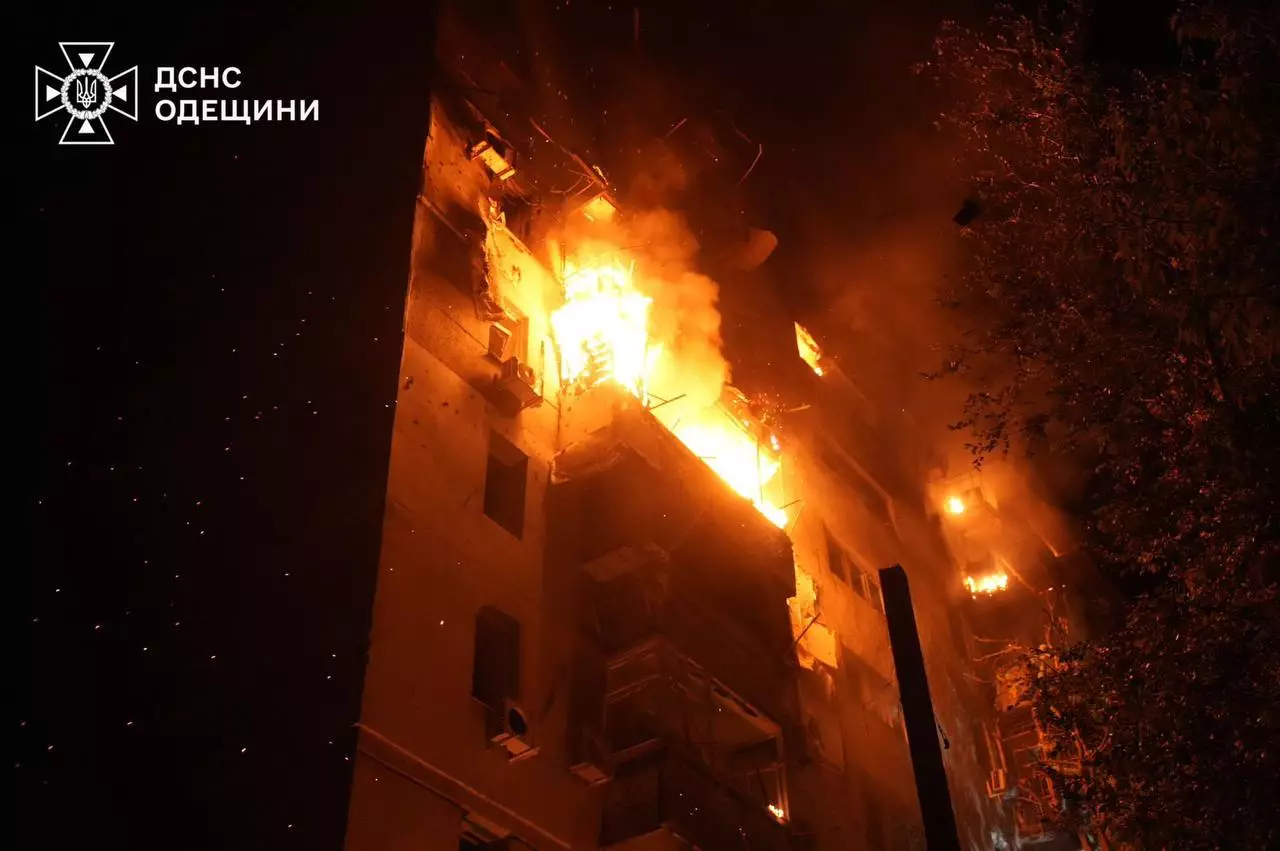
Apartment building in Odesa after the attack on 19 July 2025

On 19 July, one person was killed in a Russian drone attack on Odesa.

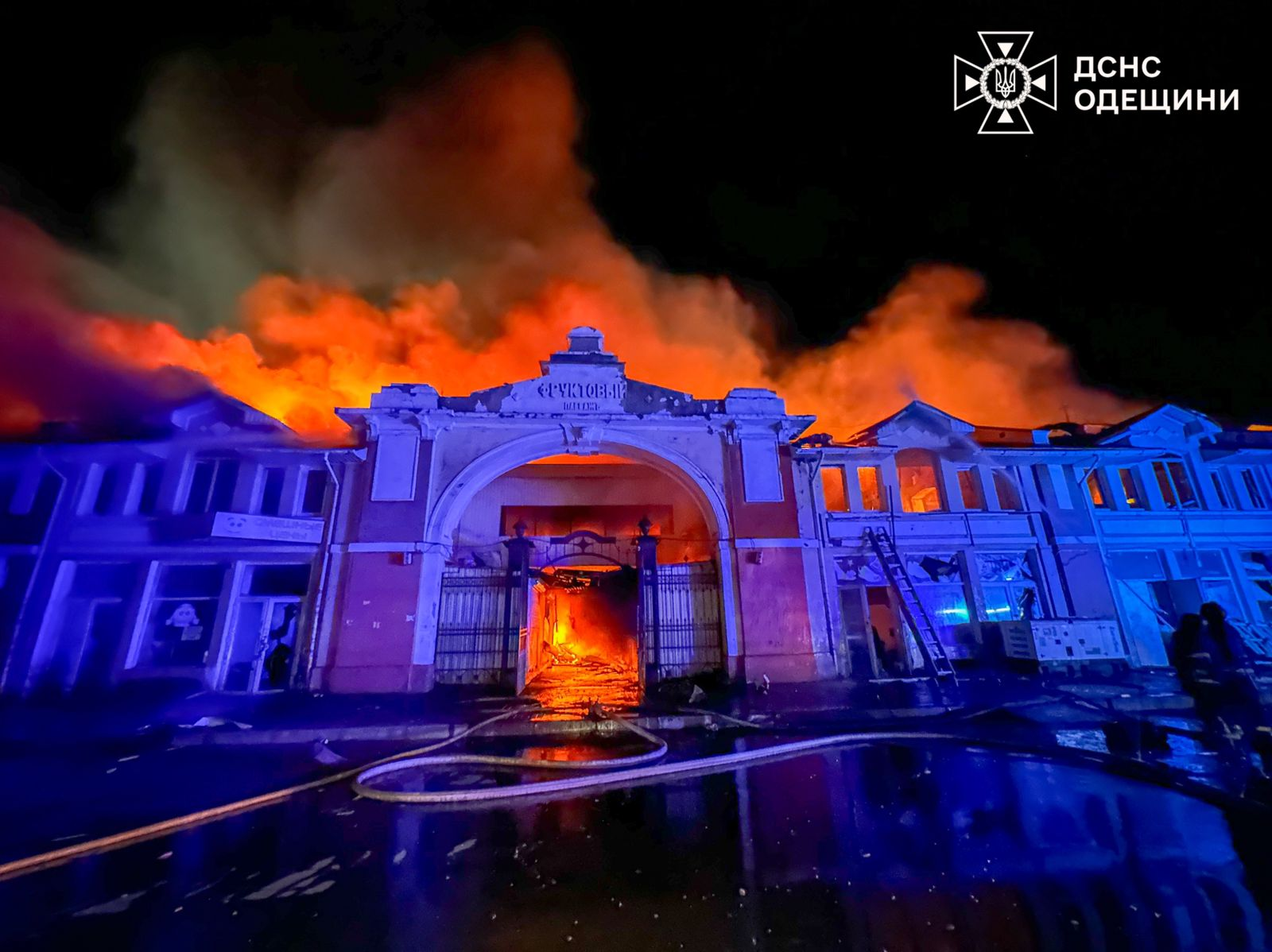
Pryvoz Market's famed Fruit Passage after the strike on 24 July 2025

On 24 July, after failed peace talks, Russia and Ukraine made strikes on each other's Black Sea coasts. As a result of Russian overnight attacks, Odesa's historical boulevard, which is a UNESCO Heritage site, and the famous Pryvoz Market were hit. Civilian structures and railway rolling stock were damaged, as several fires followed. Cherkasy Oblast was also hit by Russian forces.

On 10 August, three swimmers were killed by sea mines in the Black Sea off the coast of Odesa Oblast.

On 2 November, two people were killed in Russian airstrikes on Odesa Oblast.

On 18 December, one person was killed in a Russian drone attack in Odesa Oblast.

On 19 December, eight people were killed in a Russian missile attack on a bus in Odesa Oblast.

On 24 December, Russian forces struck infrastructure across Odesa Oblast, killing one person and injuring two more.

On Christmas, 25 December 2025, Russian forces fired drone and missile strikes against Odesa's port and industrial facilities. One person was killed, two more were injured.

=== 2026 ===
On 7 January, Russian forces struck Chornomorsk and Pivdennyi ports in Odesa Oblast, killing one person and injuring five more.

On 12 January, Russian forces struck energy infrastructure in Odesa Oblast, causing significant damage and leaving 33,500 consumers without electricity. Russian forces also struck two vessels near Odesa Oblast, injuring one person.

On 27 January, three people were killed in a major Russian drone attack on Odesa. Buildings hit included a vocational school, a kindergarten and an apartment blocks. The strikes also caused large fires.

On 6 February, a Ukrainian soldier was killed in a vehicle bombing in Odesa.

On 9 February, one person was killed in a Russian airstrike on Odesa.

On 13 February, a Russian attack on Odesa Oblast killed one person and injured six others, three of them critically.

On 14 February, one person was killed in a Russian drone strike on Odesa.

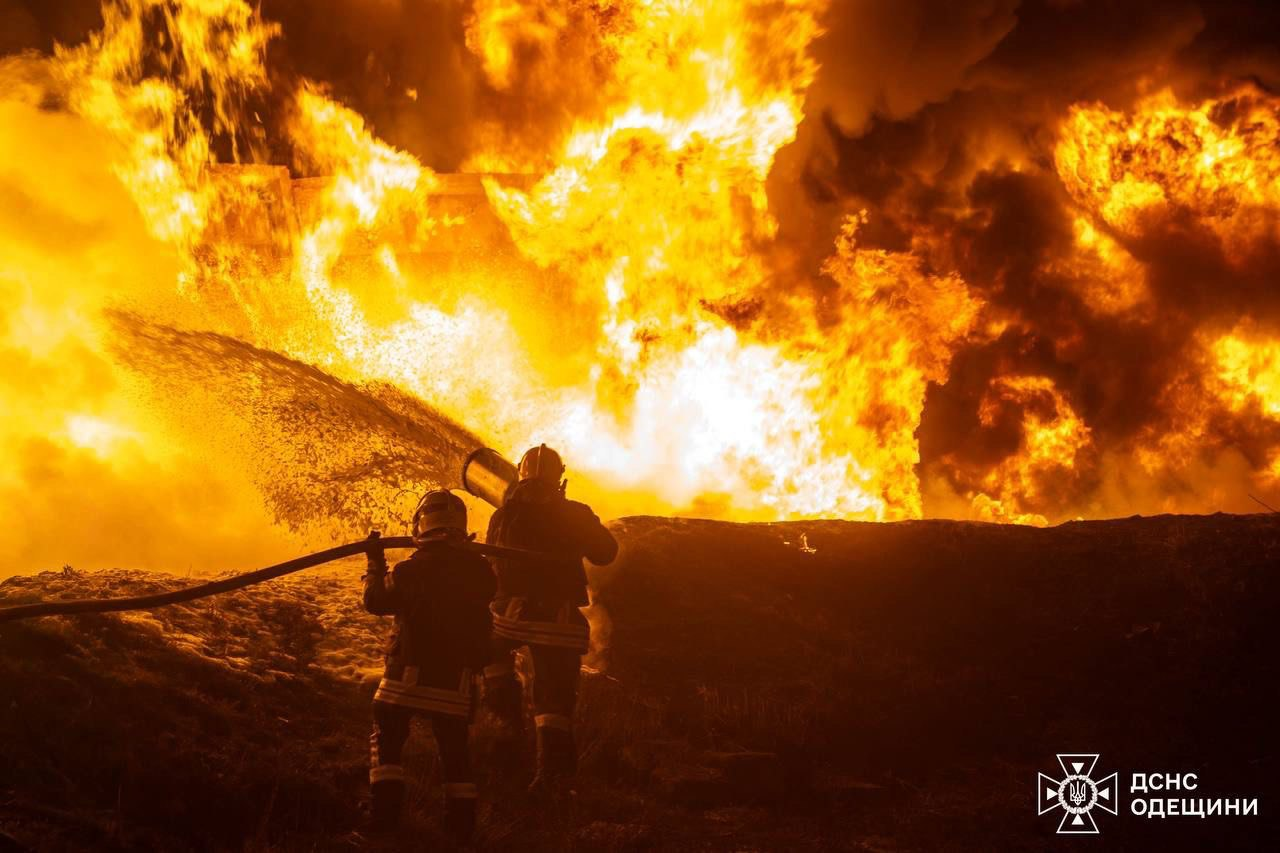
Railway depot in Odesa Oblast after drone attack on 15 February

On 15 February, the Odessa Oblast Regional Recruitment Center in Odesa was attacked by a group of civilians. A "violator of military registration" was being escorted to the Recruitment Centre when the civilians attacked. Using tear gas and physical violence, one military officer suffered a burned cornea from tear gas, while a military vehicle and camera were damaged.

On 23 February, two people were killed in Russian drone strikes in Odesa Oblast.

On 28 March, two people were killed in Russian attacks on Odesa.

On 6 April, Russian forces attacked Odesa, killing two women and a toddler and injuring others.

On 13–14 April, Russian drones struck Izmail port in Southern Odesa where two foreign civilian vessels, along with local infrastructure and equipment, were affected. In surrounding parts of the region, certain buildings and vehicles were harmed, resulting in the hospitalization of a 51-year-old man.

On 15 April, one person was killed in a Russian drone strike in Odesa, and six were injured.

On 16 April, nine people were killed in Odesa when Russia launched drone and missile strikes in its most lethal attack on Ukraine so far this year.

On 24 April, two people were killed in a Russian drone strike on Odesa.

On 30 April, Russian forces struck Odesa overnight with a series of drones, hitting residential areas and civilian infrastructure across several districts. Officials said at least 18 people were injured, two of them severely.

On 3 May, two people were killed in Russian attacks on Odesa oblast.

On 26 May, a Russian attack on Odesa killed one person, injured three others and damaged infrastructure.

On 29 May, a Russian drone strike damaged a Turkish ship sailing from Odesa and injured its crew.

On 18 June, Russian drones struck two foreign civilian vessels that had departed Ukrainian ports, killing one crew member and injuring five others, according to Odesa Oblast governor Oleh Kiper.

On 19 June, Odesa Oblast Governor Oleh Kiper reported that Russian drones had attacked two foreign civilian vessels sailing from Ukrainian ports under the flags of Panama and Saint Kitts and Nevis the previous evening. One crew member was killed and five others were injured. In a separate overnight strike, drones hit a truck parking area in the region, setting fire to empty fuel and gas tankers and killing one person and injuring four others.

On 22 June, Russian drones struck civilian vessels in the Black Sea that were bound for ports in Odesa Oblast, killing an Egyptian crew member on a Panama-flagged bulk carrier.

On 1 July, Russian missiles struck a nine-storey building and a leisure complex in Bilhorod-Dnistrovskyi District, killing ten people and injuring seven, including three children.

On 6 July, Russian forces launched a drone attack on Odesa, injuring a 23-year-old man and causing widespread damage.

On 8 July, a Russian ballistic missile attack on Odesa killed at least four people and injured seven.

On 11 July, a missile strike on Odesa killed two people.

On 13 July, a Russian strike hit a Togolese-flagged cargo vessel unloading mineral fertilisers at the port of Odesa, killing five people and injuring ten. Three foreign crew members were among those killed. Separate overnight attacks on Odesa Oblast injured five people, including a five-year-old child, and damaged a bus depot, a sanatorium and other civilian sites.

On 14 July, an Azerbaijani citizen who captained the civilian cargo ship Atlas Bey was killed in a drone attack off the coast of Odesa. That same day, a Russian drone struck a Marshall Islands-flagged civilian vessel during an attack on port infrastructure in Odesa Oblast, killing two people and setting the ship on fire.

On 15 July, a Russian missile struck a multi-storey apartment building in Odesa, killing three people and injuring at least six. Three people, including two children, were rescued. Other buildings and facilities in the city were damaged, while a drone strike elsewhere in Odesa Oblast damaged a petrol station. The same day, a Russian drone struck a Marshall Islands-flagged civilian cargo ship, causing a fire and killing two people.

On 17 July, Russian attacks on Odesa and Odesa Oblast killed two people and injured at least ten others. One of those killed was a Ukrainian Red Cross volunteer.

On 18 July, Russian attacks also killed a 77-year-old man and damaged a Marshall Islands-flagged civilian vessel in an attack on port infrastructure. A fire broke out aboard the ship, and four of its 17 crew members were injured.

On 19 July, Russian forces struck a Guinea-Bissau-flagged cargo ship carrying corn off Odesa, killing nine crew members, among them four Indian citizens, and a Ukrainian seaport pilot.

On 20 July, a Russian strike on a Guinea-Bissau-flagged cargo ship near Odesa killed at least 10 people; eight crew members were rescued.

On 21 July, a Russian strike on central Odesa damaged a building and injured four people.

On 22 July, Russian drone attacks in Odesa Oblast killed one woman and injured two people. One drone struck a two-storey building in Odesa, damaging the building and an auto repair shop.

On 26 July, the Guinea-Bissau flagged cargo vessel MV Golden Leo sank off the coast of Odesa a week after being attacked by Russian drones, killing 10 people on board, including four Indian nationals.

On 1 August, Russian forces reportedly struck fuel storage tanks at the port of Odesa.

On 6 August, Russia struck the civilian cargo ship Mera Queen in the Black Sea, killing a Ukrainian sailor and injuring three others.

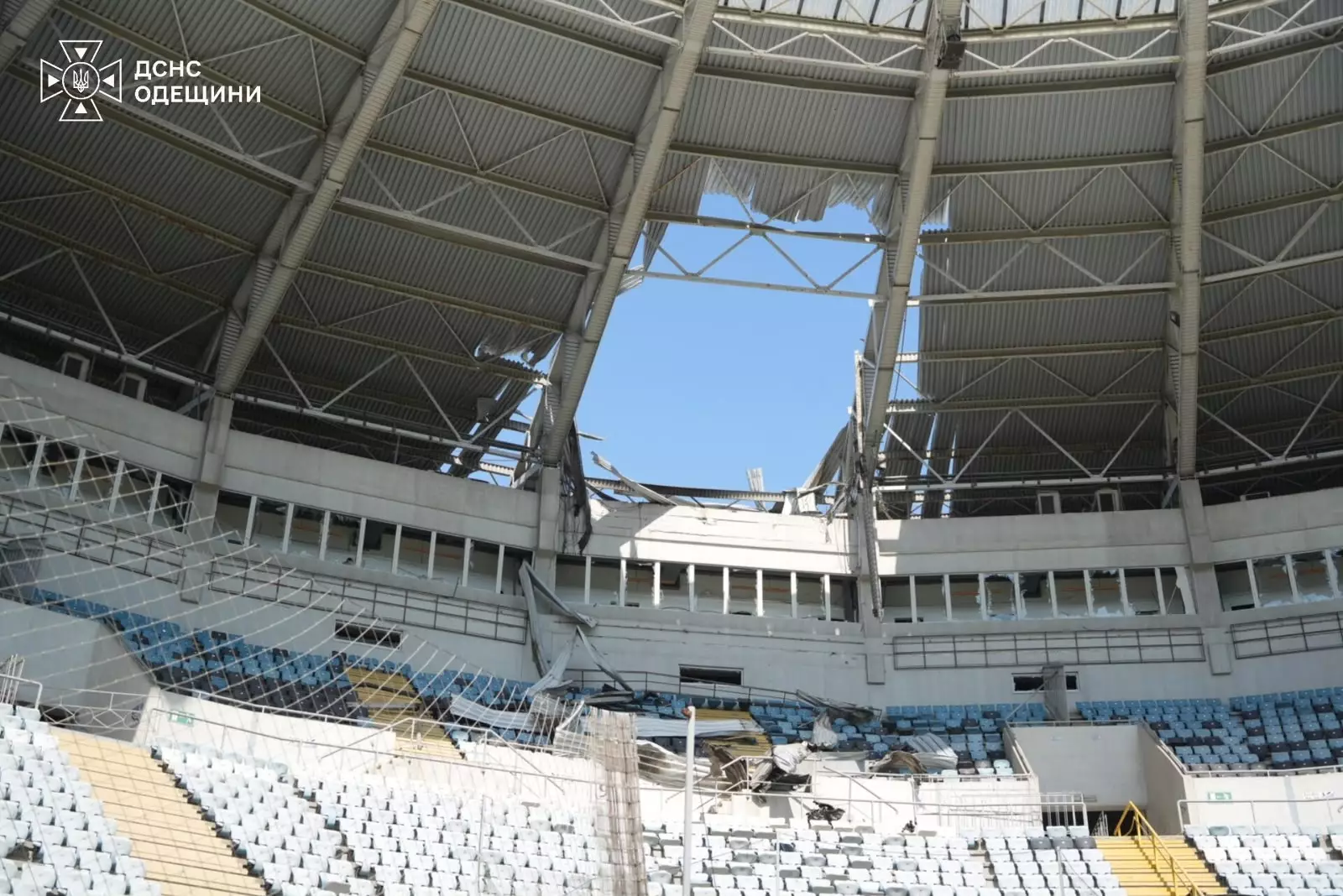
Chornomorets Stadium in Odesa after the attack on 7 August 2026

On 7 August, an attack by Russian forces damaged Chornomorets football stadium in Odesa and left one person injured.

On the night of 8–9 August, Russian forces launched a large-scale attack on Odesa and Odesa Oblast using 11 missiles of several types and up to 100 drones. Strikes were recorded at nine locations, and the attack continued into the afternoon of 9 August. President Zelenskyy said the attack on Odesa’s port was part of a Russian campaign against global food security. UNESCO said the attack had damaged six historic buildings within the World Heritage-listed Historic Centre of Odesa and condemned the strike.

On 13 August, a Russian Shahed drone struck a passenger train in Odesa Oblast, killing the driver and assistant driver; the 340 passengers and other crew members were evacuated without injury. In a separate attack, Russian strikes hit port infrastructure in Odesa Oblast overnight, causing damage and a fire.

On 16 August, a Russian jet-powered drone struck a post office in a shopping centre on the outskirts of Odesa, injuring four people. Later that day, another drone attack on civilian infrastructure in Odesa Oblast destroyed two residential buildings and injured three people.

On 20 August, a Russian drone attack on Odesa Oblast injured four people and damaged a restaurant.

From 26 August to 1 September, Russian forces carried out daily attacks on logistics and energy infrastructure in Odesa Oblast, damaging port facilities, warehouses and fuel tanks; at least three ships were also damaged.

On the night of 26-27 August, Russian attacks on Odesa damaged infrastructure, an educational facility and a high-rise residential building; no casualties were reported.

On 29 August, Russian attacks killed one person in Odesa.

Late on 31 August, a large Russian aerial attack on Odesa and the surrounding region used missiles, guided bombs and several types of drones, with energy and other civilian infrastructure reported among the targets.

== International reactions ==
Denise Brown, UN official and the Head of the United Nations in Ukraine, condemned Russian attacks on grain storage facilities and port infrastructure, aggravating global food security: "Civilians and civilian infrastructure must be respected – they should never be a target". The UN called Russian bombing of UNESCO World Heritage Sites in Odesa a possible war crime.

Amnesty International also condemned Russian attacks on Odesa: "...Russia’s threat to treat all ships travelling to Ukrainian ports through the Black Sea as carriers of military equipment reveals its readiness to strip those most in need of critical food supplies for its own military aims and sends a clear message that Russian forces are prepared to commit new war crimes. By stepping up its war of aggression in this manner, Russia is holding some of the world’s lowest income countries hostage to its military and political agenda."

== See also ==
- Kharkiv strikes (2022–present)
- Lviv strikes (2022–present)
- Dnipro strikes (2022–present)
- List of residential strikes during the Russian invasion (May 2022)
