= Zatoka Bridge =

Bridge in Ukraine

Zatoka Bridge Підйомний міст у Затоці
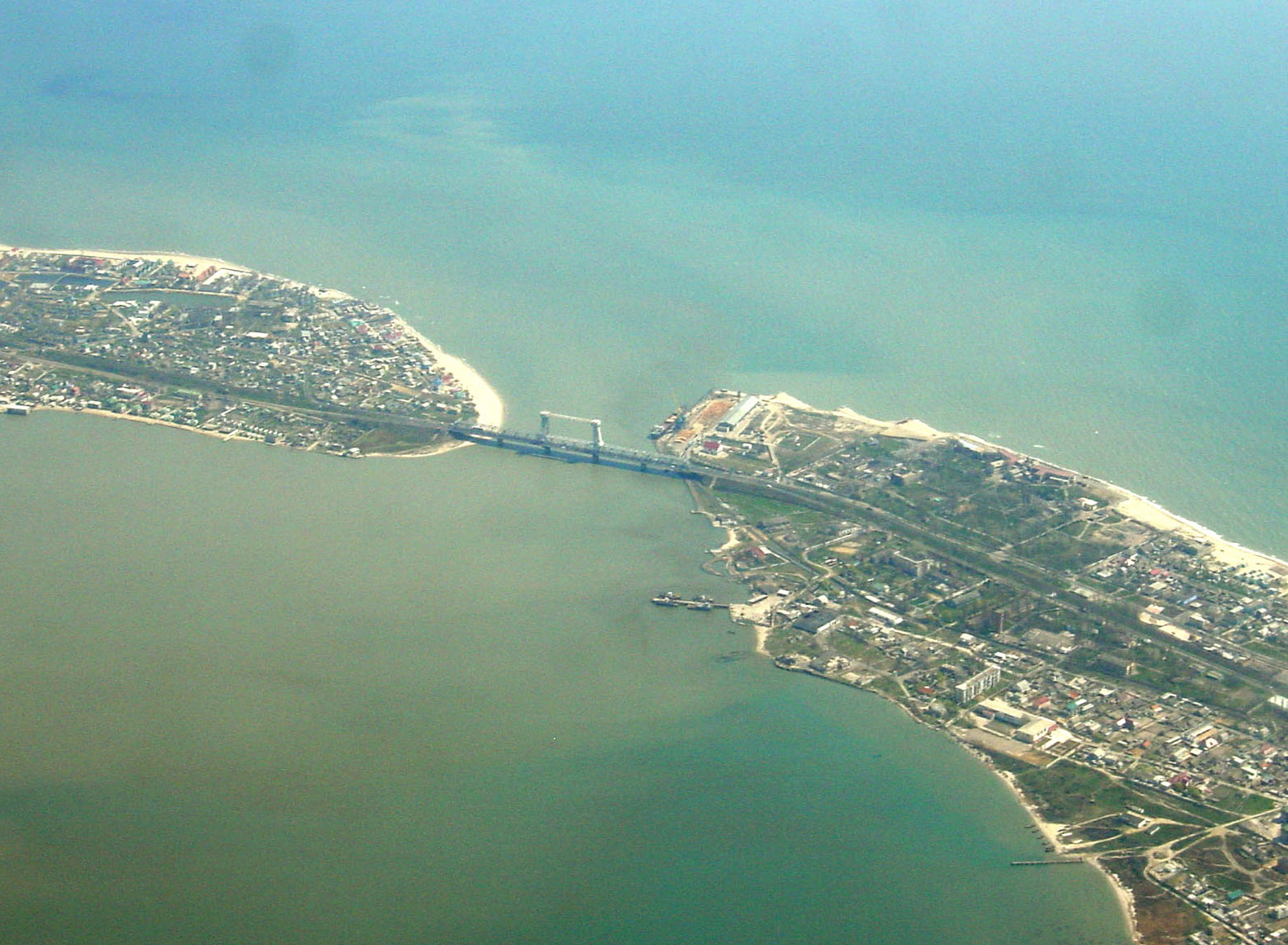
- The Zatoka Bridge in 2005
- Coordinates: 46°04′35″N 30°28′12″E
- Carries: Highway H33; Odessa–Basarabeasca railway line
- Crosses: Dniester Estuary
- Locale: Zatoka, Ukraine
- Official name: Підйомний міст у Затоці

Characteristics
- Design: Drawbridge (Vertical-lift bridge)
- Total length: 350 m (1,150 ft)

History
- Opened: 1955

Zatoka Bridge (Ukrainian: Підйомний міст у Затоці) is a vertical lift road and rail bridge in Ukraine, crossing the Dniester Estuary in Zatoka, Bilhorod-Dnistrovskyi Raion, Odesa Oblast.

The bridge opened in 1955 and carries Highway H33 (the former P70) between Odesa and Bilhorod-Dnistrovskyi, and the railway line from Odesa to Bessarabia.

The bridge is strategically important as the only direct land connection from Odesa to Budjak and Romania. During the Russian invasion of Ukraine that began in 2022, the bridge has been repeatedly targeted by Russian missiles. On 10 February 2023 the bridge was hit by a Russian naval drone.

== See also ==
- 2022 bombing of Odesa
- List of bridges in Ukraine
- Rail transport in Ukraine
