= Karolino-Buhaz rural hromada =

Coordinates: 46°06′27″N 30°30′00″E

Karolino-Buhaz rural hromada Кароліно-Бугазька сільська громада
- Hromada
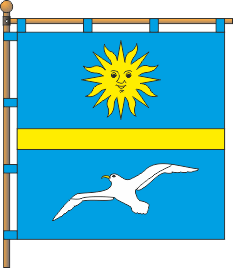
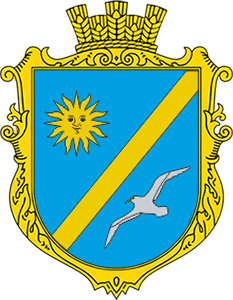
- Flag Coat of arms
- Interactive map of Karolino-Buhaz rural hromada
- Country: Ukraine
- Oblast: Odesa Oblast
- Raion: Bilhorod-Dnistrovskyi Raion
- Admin. center: Karolino-Buhaz

Area
  - Total: 21.3 km^{2} (8.2 sq mi)

Population (2020)
  - Total: 4,512
  - Density: 212/km^{2} (549/sq mi)
- CATOTTG code: UA51040050000073907
- Settlements: 2
- Rural settlements: 1
- Villages: 1

Karolino-Buhaz rural hromada (Ukrainian: Кароліно-Бугазька сільська громада) is a rural hromada in Bilhorod-Dnistrovskyi Raion of Odesa Oblast in southwestern Ukraine. It contains two rural-type settlements: Karolino-Buhaz (the administrative center) and Zatoka. Population: 4,764 (2022 estimate)

Until 18 July 2020, the hromada belonged to Ovidiopol Raion. The raion was abolished in July 2020 as part of the administrative reform of Ukraine, which reduced the number of raions of Odesa Oblast to seven. The area of Ovidiopol Raion was split between Bilhorod-Dnistrovskyi and Odesa Raions, with Karolino-Buhaz rural hromada being transferred to Bilhorod-Dnistrovskyi Raion.
