= 6 March 2024 Odesa strike =

Russian missile attack in Odesa, Ukraine

- Part of the Odesa strikes (2022–present) and Russian invasion of Ukraine
- Date: 6 March 2024
- Time: 10:40 (EET)
- Location: Odesa, Ukraine
- Perpetrator: Russia
- Deaths: 5
- Injuries: Unspecified amount

On 6 March 2024, a Russian missile exploded in Odesa, Ukraine near a meeting between President of Ukraine Volodymyr Zelenskyy and Prime Minister of Greece Kyriakos Mitsotakis, killing five people.

== Attack ==
The attack occurred at around 10:40 local time (11:40 Moscow time) during a visit by Greek Prime Minister Kyriakos Mitsotakis to Ukraine, during which he met with Ukrainian President Volodymyr Zelenskyy in the city's port area and was to visit a building damaged in a previous attack on 2 March that killed twelve people, including five children, and meet with members of the Greek community. Ukrainian authorities issued an air-raid warning in Odesa Oblast at 10:40, which was followed by a powerful explosion. At 10:45, the Ukrainian Air Force reported a threat of ballistic missile use in the area.

Greek state minister Stavros Papastavrou said that the missile landed about 150 meters from where Mitsotakis and Zelenskyy were meeting. Another source described the attack as the "closest call ever" on Zelenskyy's life. Mitsotakis later said that it occurred as they were getting inside their cars, adding that they "did not have time to get to a shelter." However, the source and a spokesperson for the Ukrainian Southern Defense Forces stated that they believed it was not intentionally targeting the two leaders, who were unharmed.

The Ukrainian military said five people were killed in the attack and several others were injured. The Russian Defence Ministry claimed that it had successfully targeted a hangar in the port of Odesa storing Ukrainian naval drones. There were no casualties among Mitsotakis' delegation.

== Reactions ==
In a joint press conference with Mitsotakis following the attack, Zelenskyy said that Russia did not "care where to hit" and that it had "either gone crazy or they don't control what their terrorist army is doing". Mitsotakis described the incident as "a very intense experience".

A spokesperson for the United States National Security Council described the attack as "another reminder of how Russia is continuing to attack Ukraine recklessly every single day and of Ukraine's urgent needs, in particular, for air defense interceptors."

President of the European Commission Ursula von der Leyen condemned the attack, describing it as "vile" and a "new attempt at terror" by Russia.

== See also ==
- Assassination attempts on Volodymyr Zelenskyy
