= List of residential strikes during the Russian invasion (May 2022) =

The attacks on residential areas in Ukraine during the Russian-Ukrainian war constitute a war crime committed by the Russian military during the full-scale military invasion of Ukraine.

== General information ==
According to the UN Human Rights Monitoring Mission in Ukraine, 589 Ukrainian civilians are known to have been killed during May 2022.

=== The destruction of settlements near the front line ===
In settlements located near the front line, residential and other civilian buildings (including medical facilities, educational institutions and commercial premises) are constantly coming under fire. Throughout May 2022, shelling took place along the border communities of Chernihiv, Sumy and Kharkiv regions, as well as communities in Zaporizhzhia, Dnipropetrovsk, Kherson and Mykolaiv regions, using missiles, drones, mortars, artillery, multiple launch rocket systems, armoured vehicles and small arms.

Along the national border:

- In the Chernihiv region — the Koryukivka, Novhorod-Siverskyi, Semenivka and Snovsk communities.
- In the Sumy region — the Bilopil, Velykopysariv, Hlukhiv, Krasnopil, Myropil, Novoslobodsk, Putivl, Khotyn and Yunakiv communities.
- In the Kharkiv region — the Vilkhuvatska, Vovchanska, Dvorichanska, Derhachivska, Zolochivska and Lypetska communities

Between the temporarily occupied territory:

- In the Kharkiv region: the communities of Borivka, Dvorichansk, Izium, Kindrashivka, Kupiansk, Kurylivka, Oskil, and Petropavlivka
- In the Luhansk region: the communities of Krasnorichensk and Lysychansk
- In the Donetsk region: the communities of Zvanivka and Siversk

== List ==
Attacks in which fatalities have been reported are marked in red.

| Date and place | | Type of weapon | Details of the attack | Casualties (fatalities/injuries) |
|---|---|---|---|---|
| 02/05 | Odesa | missile strike | Church | — |
| 05/05 | Donetsk Region, Kramatorsk | missile strike | Civilian infrastructure | 0/25 |
| 07/05 | Luhansk Oblast, Bilohorivka | air strike | Direct hit on the school building | 60+/? |
| 07/05 | Donetsk Region, Kramatorsk | missile strike | Civilian infrastructure | 0/2 |
| 08/05 | Odesa Region, Odesa District | missile strike | Critical and civil infrastructure | — |
| 09/05 | Odesa | Х-22 | Riviera shopping center | 1/5 |
| 09/05 | Donetsk Region, Adamivka | missile strike | A visit to the hermitage of Saint John of Shanghai at the Holy Dormition Svyatogorsk Lavra | — |
| 09/05 | Donetsk Region, Dolyna | air strike | A visit to the St George's Hermitage of the Holy Dormition Svyatogorsk Lavra | — |
| 12/05 | Kharkiv Region, Shebelinka | artillery fire | A Russian shell struck a hangar building | 3/5 |
| 12/05 | Kharkiv Region, Derhachi | artillery fire | The humanitarian headquarters, the registry office, the hospital, the health centre and the ambulance station were damaged | 2/4 |
| 12/05 | Kharkiv | missile strike | There are reports of a missile strike occurring | — |
| 12/05 | Kharkiv Region, Udy | Multiple rocket launcher, artillery fire | Shelling of the settlement using various types of weaponry, damage to residential buildings | — |
| 13/05 | Kharkiv Region, Derhachi | missile strike | Civilian infrastructure | — |
| 16/05 | Luhansk Region, Severodonetsk | artillery fire | At least 10 people are known to have died from shelling of the city, including the hospital buildings. | 10/2+ |
| 16/05 | Odessa Region, Karolino-Buhaz | missile strike | A missile strike on a holiday resort with civilians inside | 0/4 |
| 18/05 | Mykolaiv | missile strike | Civilian infrastructure | — |
| 19/05 | Donetsk Region, Bakhmut | missile strike | Civilian infrastructure | — |
| 20/05 | Kharkiv Region, Lozova | missile strike | Community centre | — |
| 21/05 | Kherson Region, Bilozerka | cluster munitions | Shelling of residential areas | 3+/10 |
| 23/05 | Kharkiv Region, Merefa | missile strike | Civilian infrastructure | — |
| 25/05 | Zaporizhzhia | missile strike | Civilian infrastructure | 1/3 |
| 25/05 | Sumy Region, Krasnopillia | missile strike | Civilian infrastructure | — |
| 25/05 | Donetsk Region, Kramatorsk | missile strike | Civilian infrastructure | — |
| 30/05 | Mykolaiv Region, Novyi Buh | OTR-21 Tochka | Civilian infrastructure | 0/2 |
| 31/05 | Donetsk Region, Sloviansk | missile strike | Civilian infrastructure | 3/6 |
| 31/05 | Donetsk Region, Avdiivka | missile strike | Civilian infrastructure | — |

== See also ==
- War crimes in the Russo-Ukrainian war (2022–present)
