= Dniester Estuary =

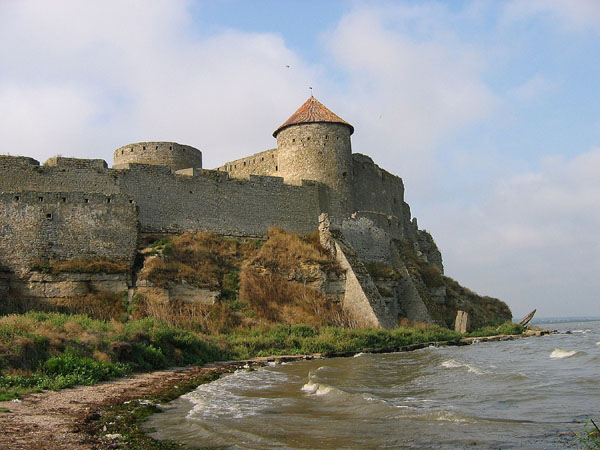
- The coast of the estuary near the castle of Bilhorod-Dnistrovskyi

- Location within Ukraine
- Location: Black Sea
- Coordinates: 46°14′N 30°21′E
- River sources: Dniester
- Ocean/sea sources: Atlantic Ocean
- Basin countries: Ukraine
- Max. length: 45.2 km (28.1 mi)
- Max. width: 12 km (7.5 mi)
- Surface area: 360–408 km^{2} (139–158 sq mi)
- Average depth: 1.8 m (5 ft 11 in)
- Max. depth: 2.7 m (8 ft 10 in)
- Water volume: 0.2 km^{3} (0.048 cu mi)
- Settlements: Bilhorod-Dnistrovskyi, Ovidiopol, Shabo, Zatoka

Ramsar Wetland
- Official name: Northern Part of the Dniester Liman
- Designated: 23 November 1995
- Reference no.: 765

Dniester Estuary, or Dniester Liman (Ukrainian: Дністровський лиман; Romanian: Limanul Nistrului) is a liman, formed at the point where the river Dniester flows into the Black Sea. It is located in Ukraine, in Odesa Oblast, and connects Budjak to the Ukrainian mainland. The city of Bilhorod-Dnistrovskyi lies on its western shore and Ovidiopol on its eastern shore. Shabo, situated downstream of Bilhorod-Dnistrovskyi, is known for its wine. The estuary hosts the Bilhorod-Dnistrovsky Seaport.

The area of the liman varies between 360 and 408 km^{2}, it is 42.5 km long and has maximum width of 12 km. The average depth is 1.8 m, the maximum depth 2.7 m.

On the spit separating the liman from the open Black Sea to the south is the resort town of Zatoka. The only entirely Ukrainian road connecting to Budjak is the H33 along the spit; to avoid the marshes at the northern end of the liman, Highway M15 has to cross into Moldova. The Dniester Liman is the closest open body of water to landlocked Moldova; only 3 km of Ukrainian territory separates Moldova from the Black Sea.

== 2022 Russian invasion of Ukraine ==
On 2 May 2022, during the invasion, a Russian rocket strike hit Zatoka Bridge, a strategically important bridge over the estuary.

== See also ==
- Berezan Estuary
- Tylihul Estuary
- Small Adzhalyk Estuary
- Khadzhibey Estuary
- Sukhyi Estuary
