= Port of Giurgiulești =

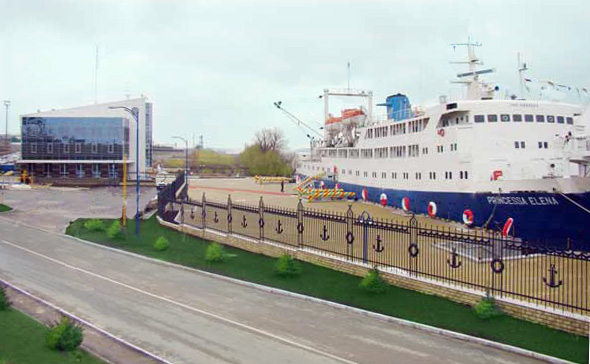
- Interactive map of Port of Giurgiulești
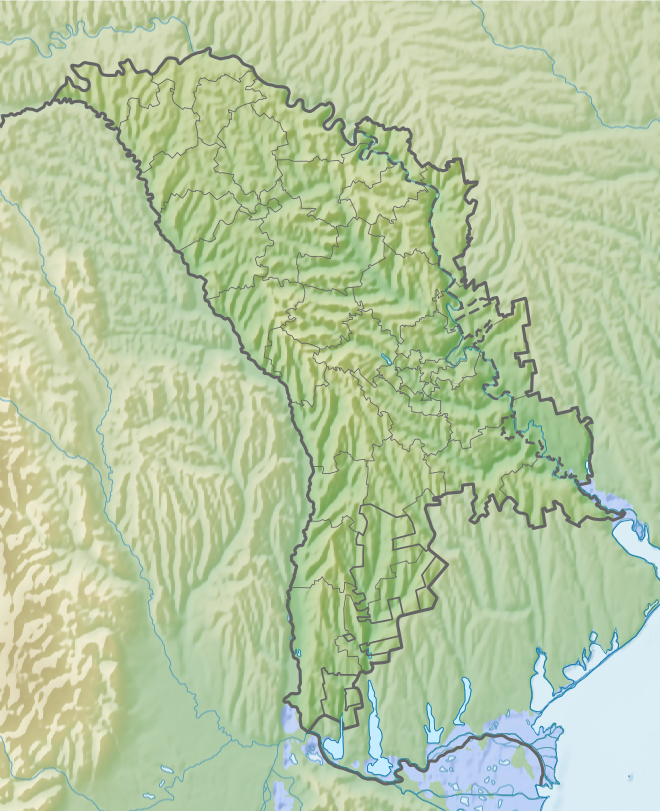
- Location within Moldova

Location
- Country: Moldova
- Location: Giurgiulești
- Coordinates: 45°28′12″N 28°12′36″E

Details
- Opened: 26 October 2006
- Owned by: Government of Romania (via Port of Constanța)

Statistics
- Website; Giurgiulești Port

The Port of Giurgiulești (Romanian: Portul Giurgiulești), officially the Giurgiulești International Free Port (Romanian: Portul Internațional Liber Giurgiulești, PILG), is a port on the Danube River at its confluence with the Prut and the only port in Moldova.

It is Moldova's only port accessible to seagoing vessels, situated at km 133 (nautical mile 72) of the River Danube in the south of Moldova. It operates both a grain and an oil terminal as well as a passenger terminal. The building of an oil terminal started in 1996 and it was launched on 26 October 2006. Giurgiulești passenger port was officially opened on 17 March 2009, when the first sea passenger trip Giurgiulești-Istanbul-Giurgiulești was launched. The Grain Transhipment Terminal was opened on 24 July 2009. A container facility was added in 2012. As of 2015, a second grain terminal was under construction. The port has only 1,476 feet (450 m) on the shore of the river with room remaining for one additional terminal. Volume shipped through the port increased 65% in 2014.

The port is managed by a Dutch firm, Danube Logistics, which, with the aid of the European Bank for Reconstruction and Development, has invested $60 million in the project. There are 460 employees, half from the village of Giurgiulești, which is 0.5 miles (0.80 km) inland. As of 2015, there were no facilities in Giurgiulești which catered to travelers or visiting crewmen.

It has a status of free economic zone until 2030.

The Port of Giurgiulești was built as result of a 2005 territorial exchange with Ukraine, where Moldova received a 430 meter (470 yard) bank of the Danube river (which is an international waterway).

Ukraine was supposed to receive a short section of road that leaves and re-enters Ukrainian territory near the Moldovan village of Palanca at the easternmost point of Moldova. After a long territorial dispute, it was decided that Moldova would keep the land but the road itself would be owned and maintained by Ukrainians. So now all vehicles have to go through the checkpoint while driving from Ukraine to Ukraine.
