= R35 =

R35 may refer to:

- R35 (South Africa), a road
- HMS Cromwell (R35), a destroyer of the Royal Navy
- Nissan GT-R, a sports car
- R35: Causes severe burns, a risk phrase
- R35 expressway, in the Czech Republic, now the D35 motorway
- Renard R.35, a Belgian prototype airliner
- Renault R35, a French tank
