= Zatoka, Odesa Oblast =

Rural locality in Odesa Oblast, Ukraine

Zatoka Затoка
- Rural settlement
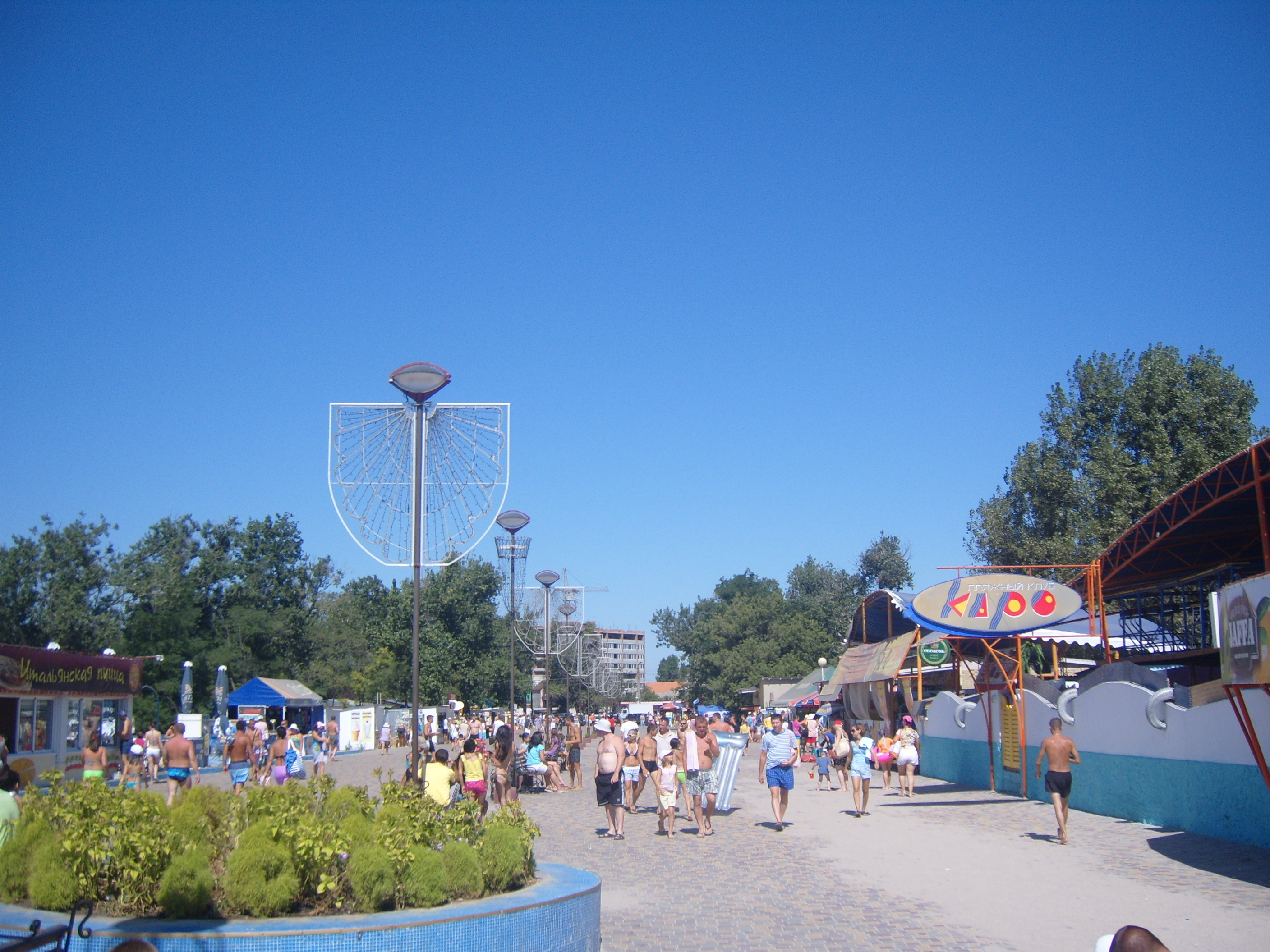
- Zatoka central park.

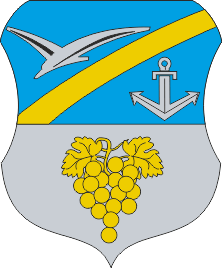
- Coat of arms
- Interactive map of Zatoka
- Location within Odesa Oblast Location within Ukraine
- Coordinates: 46°4′2″N 30°27′25″E
- Country: Ukraine
- Oblast: Odesa Oblast
- Raion: Bilhorod-Dnistrovskyi Raion
- Hromada: Karolino-Buhaz rural hromada

Area
  - Total: 31 km^{2} (12 sq mi)
- Elevation: 28 m (92 ft)

Population (2022)
  - Total: 1,972
  - Density: 64/km^{2} (160/sq mi)
- Time zone: UTC+2 (EET)
  - Summer (DST): UTC+3 (EEST)

Zatoka (Ukrainian: Затoка, romanized: Zatoka; Romanian: Zatoca or Bugaz) is a rural settlement in Bilhorod-Dnistrovskyi Raion, Odesa Oblast, in southwestern Ukraine. It belongs to Karolino-Buhaz rural hromada, one of the hromadas of Ukraine. The population of Zatoka is 1,972 (2022 estimate). Its name comes from the Ukrainian-language word zatoka, meaning "bay".

The settlement is a local beach resort. Additionally, Zatoka contains a small port named Buhaz, which has a single pier and is part of the Port of Bilhorod-Dnistrovsky. The settlement is located on a sand spit of the Dniester Estuary next to where the Dniester flows into the Black Sea. It is 60 km from Odesa and 18 km from the city of Bilhorod-Dnistrovskyi in Odesa Oblast, in the historical region of Budjak or southern Bessarabia.

Zatoka Bridge opened in 1955 and carries the R70 national road and the railway line from Odesa to Bessarabia.

== History ==
Near the village there is a monument of Trypillian culture and the Copper Age - Akkembetskyi mound. The settlement of Zatoka was founded in 1827, as a result of the installation of a navigation marker (lighthouse) at the Tsarehradske mouth.

In 1850, the Black Sea Lighthouse Directorate decided to: "To grant the status of a lighthouse headed by a pilot and a team of 6 sailors to the Dniester-Carehrad sign from September 21, 1851." The lighthouse has the status of an engineering monument.

In 1877, the lighthouse was reconstructed. Instead of a wooden structure, a 16-meter-high tower with lantern rooms was built, in which a Fresnel lens with a gas-fired installation was installed.

In March 1918, Bessarabia reunited with Romania, and in April it was officially announced that these lands became part of the Kingdom of Romania. The mouth of the Dniester formed the new state border. The southern part of modern Zatoka (Bugaz) belonged to Romania.

From 1940, the whole of Bessarabia, including Bugaz, was annexed by the Soviet Union, and was incorporated into its Ukrainian Soviet Socialist Republic.

In 1941, Zatoka became part of Romania again. On August 21–22, 1944, the Second Jassy–Kishinev offensive took place, as a result of which Zatoka was retaken by the Soviet Union.

On November 14, 1945, the village of Buhaz was renamed Zatoka. In 1945, a new school was opened in house number 3 on Plavneva Street. In 1953, the Zatoka elementary school was located in the barracks left by the bridge builders. On December 5, 1955, a lift railway bridge was built across the Tsarehradske Estuary, which connects the Dniester Estuary and the Black Sea.

In 1964, Zatoka received urban-type settlement status.

=== 21st century ===
On 19 September 2015, local Euromaidan activist Andriy Yusov was beaten up in the town by people with pro-Russian views.

Until 18 July 2020, Zatoka belonged to Bilhorod-Dnistrovskyi Municipality. The municipality was abolished as an administrative unit in July 2020 as part of the administrative reform of Ukraine, which reduced the number of raions of Odesa Oblast to seven. The area of Bilhorod-Dnistrovskyi Municipality was merged into Bilhorod-Dnistrovskyi Raion.

On 26 July 2022, during the Russian invasion of Ukraine, Russian rocket attacks damaged several civilian buildings and injured a man.

On 26 January 2024, a law came into effect that abolished the status of urban-type settlement in Ukraine, so Zatoka became a rural settlement.

== Demographics ==
As of the 2001 Ukrainian census, Zatoka had a population of 1,372 people, of whom 70% identified themselves as Ukrainians, 20% as Russians, and 8% as Moldovans. There were also small minorities of Bulgarians, Gagauz, Belarusians, Jews, and Koreans.
