= Highway M27 (Ukraine) =

Highway in Ukraine

Highway M27
- Автошлях М27
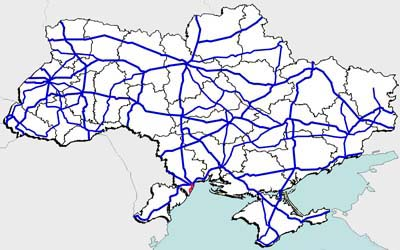

Route information
- Length: 14 km (8.7 mi)
- Existed: 2013–present

Major junctions
- North end: Odesa
- South end: Chornomorsk

Location
- Country: Ukraine
- Oblasts: Odesa

Highway system
- Roads in Ukraine; State Highways
| ← M 26 | → M 28 |

M27 is a Ukrainian international highway (M-highway) in southern Ukraine that runs from Odesa to Chornomorsk along the coast of Black Sea. Until 1 January 2013, it was designated as H04.

== Main route ==
Main route and connections to/intersections with other highways in Ukraine.

| Marker | Main settlements | Notes | Highway Interchanges |
|---|---|---|---|
| 0 km | Odesa | | |
| | Oleksandrivka | | T-16-41 |
| 14 km | Chornomorsk | | |

== See also ==
- Roads in Ukraine
- Ukraine Highways
