= Giurgiulești =

- Commune and village
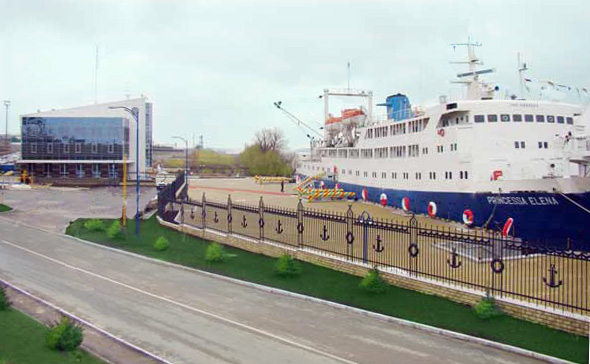
- The Port of Giurgiulești

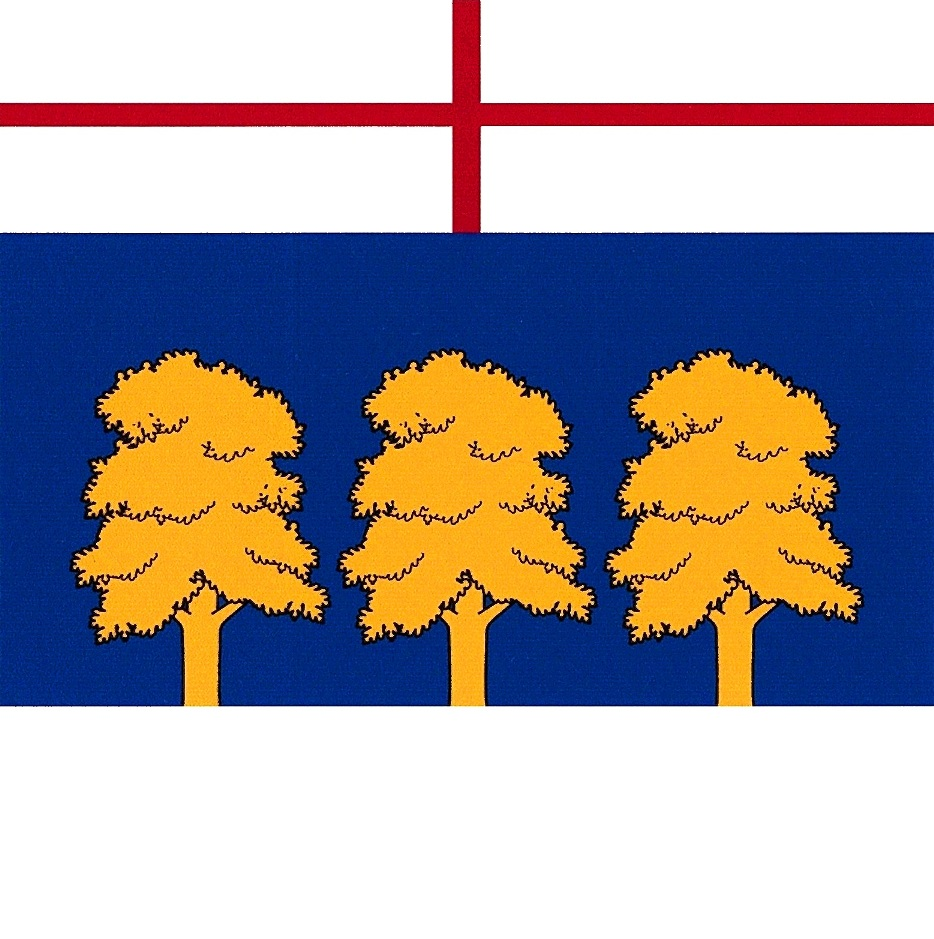
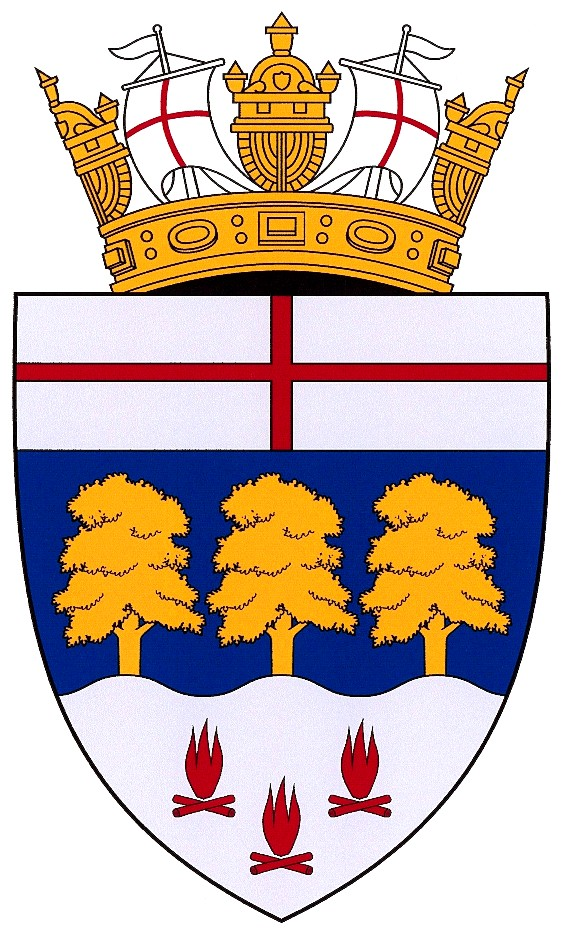
- Flag Coat of arms
- Interactive map of Giurgiulești
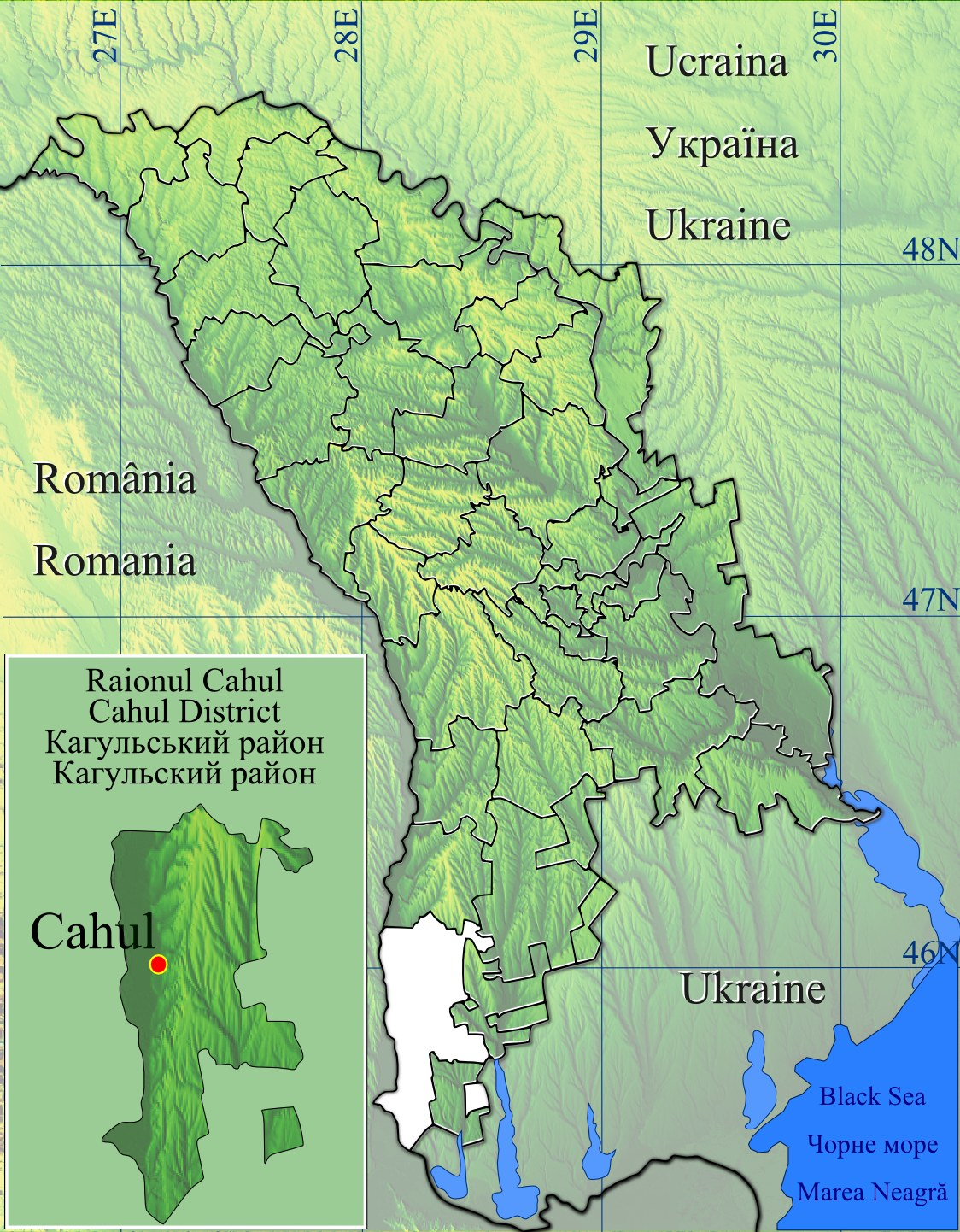
- Location of village within Cahul District Location of village within Moldova
- Coordinates: 45°29′N 28°12′E
- Country: Moldova
- District: Cahul District

Government
  - mayor: Tatiana Galateanu

Population (2014 census)
  - Total: 2,866
- Time zone: UTC+2 (EET)
  - Summer (DST): UTC+3 (EEST)

Giurgiulești (pronunciation: [dʒʲurdʒʲuˈleʃtʲ]) is a commune in the Cahul District of Moldova. It is also a border crossing point to Romania, located 10 km (6.2 mi) from Galați.

== Geography ==
The locality is in the southernmost point of Moldova, at the confluence of the river Prut with the Danube, on the border with Romania and Ukraine. The commune consists of one village, Giurgiulești.

== Economy ==
Moldova has access to the Danube for only about 480 metres (1,570 ft). Thus, the Port of Giurgiulești is the only Moldovan port on the Danube. The building of an oil terminal started there in 1996, and was finished in 2006. As of 2015 there were no facilities in Giurgiulești for travellers or visiting crew members.

The future international airport of the Lower Danube metropolitan area is located just 25 km (16 mi) from Giurgiulești.

== Demographics ==
The commune has a population of 3,074. At the 2014 census, Giurgiulești had a population of 2,866, of which 2,434 (84.9%) are Moldovans, 382 (13.33%) Romanians and 50 (2%) others, including Ukrainian, Gagauz, and Russian people.

At the 1930 census, the village had a population of 1,944, of which 1,914 (98.5%) were Romanians and 30 (1.5%) others (4 Russians, 6 Gagauzians, 8 Bulgarians, 9 Gypsies, 1 Hungarian, and 2 Greeks). At the time, it was part of Plasa Reni of Ismail County.

== Archaeology ==
Prehistoric Giurgiulesti cemetery was discovered in 1991, when the local kurgans were being excavated. This monument belongs to Suvorovo-Novodanilovka culture group, and dates back to about 4200/4100 BC or even earlier. The local settlement formed a part of the Balkan-Carpathian cultural world, but also had strong connection to the migratory steppe herders.

Suvorovo culture was a Copper Age culture that flourished on the northwest Pontic steppe and the lower Danube, and the Novodanilovka group spread at the same time along the lower Dnieper and the steppes of Ukraine.

In Giurgiulesti, there are also links to the Cucuteni-Tripolie, and Gumelnita (Bolgrad-Aldeni variant) cultures.

The grave inventory of the cemetery contains items made from flint, copper, and gold, in addition to the usual materials of the time such as bone, clay, shells, and leather.

Three spiral bracelets made of copper, and other items dated 4500-4300 BC, that were found in Giurgiulesti, are exhibited in the Moldova National Museum.

Ancient DNA from Giurgiulesti is being analyzed by scientists.

== See also ==
- Extreme points of Moldova
- Port of Giurgiulești

== Gallery ==
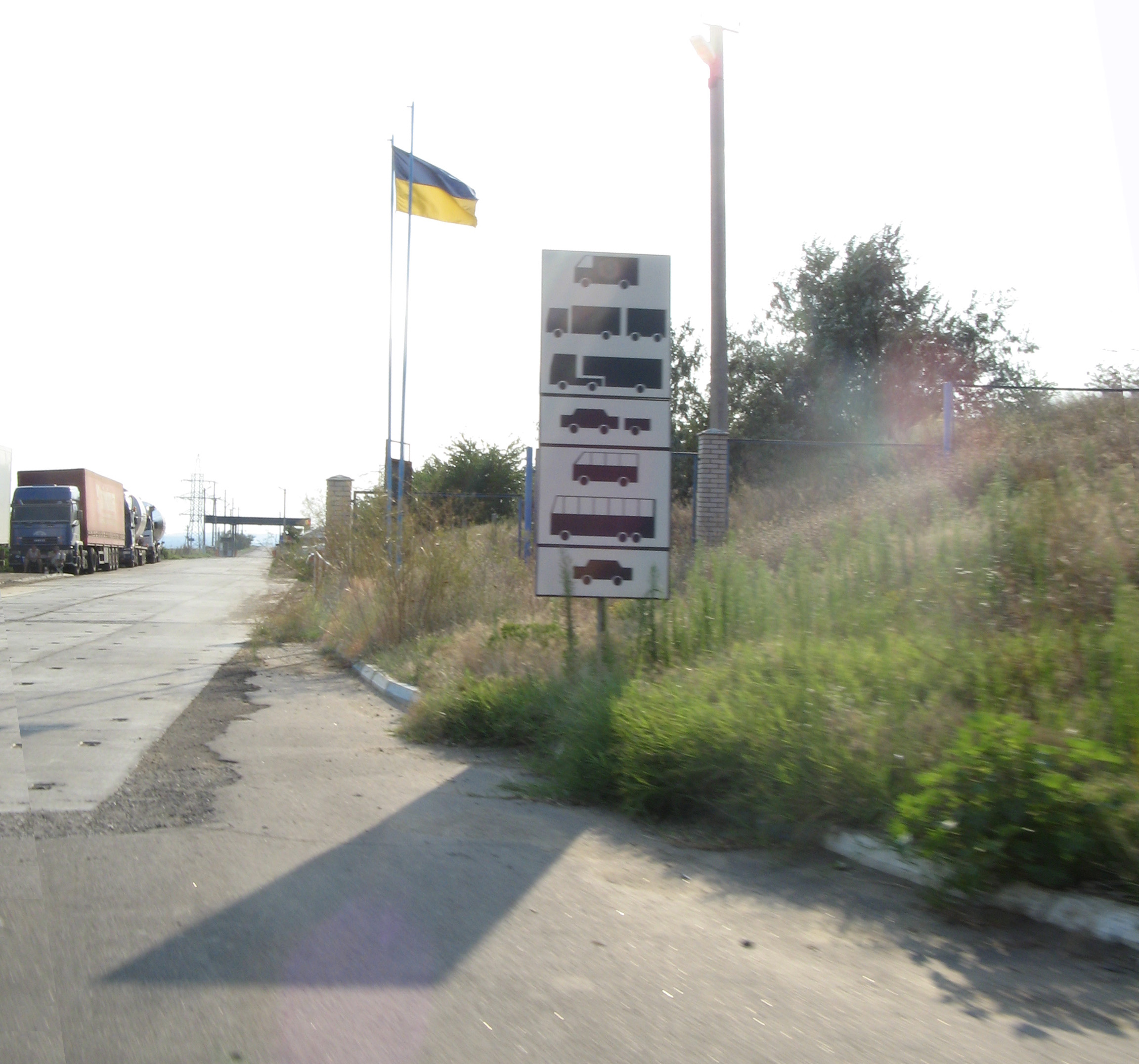
Crossing border Giurgiulești – Reni

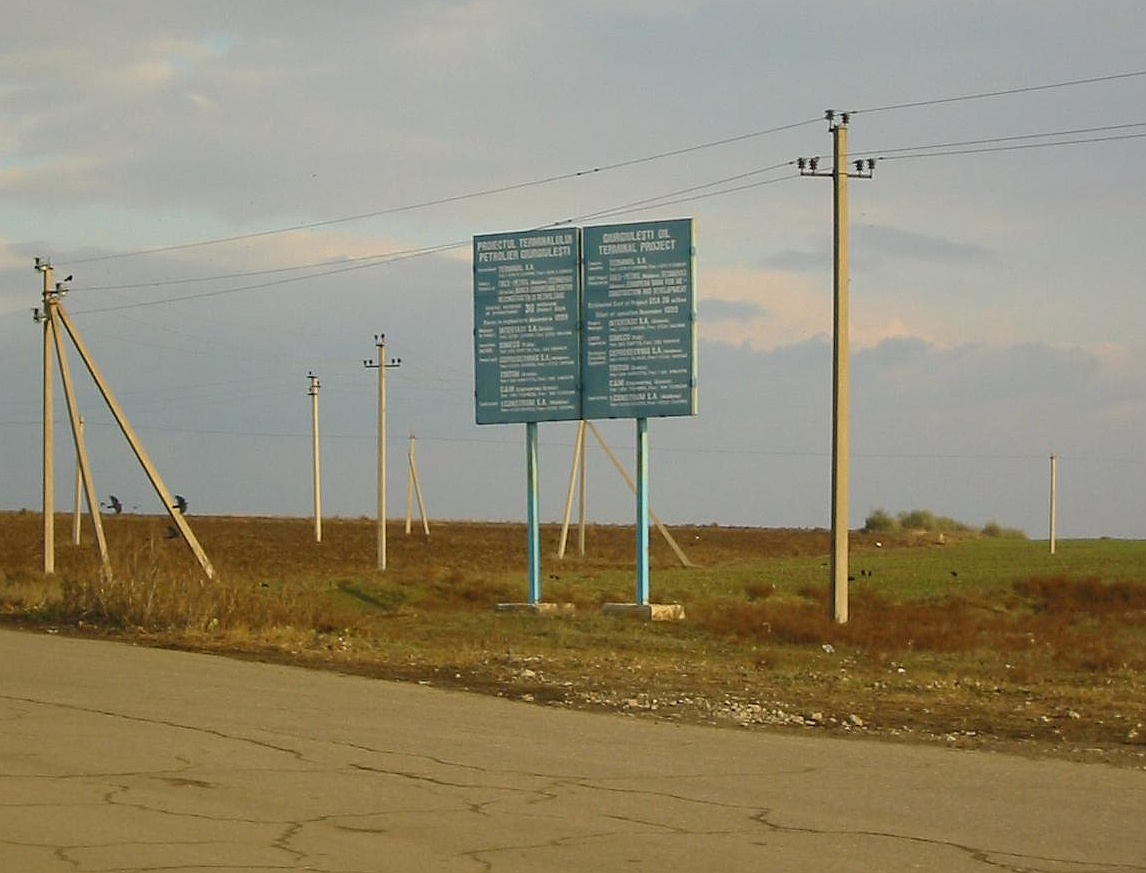
Giurgiulești Oil Terminal Project
