= List of villages in Chernihiv Oblast =

The following is a list of villages in Ukraine's Chernihiv Oblast, categorised by raion.

== Chernihiv Raion ==
- Stroivka
- Viktorivka
- Yahidne

== Koriukivka Raion ==
- Dachne
- Kyriivka

== Kulykiv Raion ==
- Baklanova Muraviyka

== Nizhyn Raion ==
- Kobyzhcha
- Kruty
- Mochalyshche
- Nova Basan
- Novyi Bykiv
- Ombysh
- Perekhodivka
- Pisky
- Plysky
- Staryi Bykiv

== Novhorod-Siverskyi Raion ==
- Hremiach
- Kostobobriv
- Mars
- Radychiv
- Shabalyniv
- Vilkhivka
- Vyshenky

== Pryluky Raion ==
- Horodnia
- Olshana

== Raion Unknown ==
- Shestovytsia
