= Mochalyshche =

Mochalyshche Мочалище
- Village
- Location within Chernihiv Oblast
- Coordinates: 50°33′59″N 31°19′25″E
- Country: Ukraine
- Oblast: Chernihiv Oblast
- Raion: Nizhyn Raion
- Hromada: Nova Basan rural hromada
- KOATUU: 7420687404
- KATOTTH: UA74040270070072839
- Founded: By 1781
- Burnt down: 18 December 1942
- Resettled: By 1978
- Administrative centre: Nova Basan

Area
  - Total: 0.808 km^{2} (0.312 sq mi)
- Elevation: 114 m (374 ft)

Population (2012)
  - Total: 141
  - Density: 174.5/km^{2} (452/sq mi)

Native language (2001)
  - Ukrainian: 97.16%
  - Russian: 2.84%
- Postal code: 17454
- Area code: +380 4632

Mochalyshche (Ukrainian: Мочалище) is a village in Nizhyn Raion of Chernihiv Oblast, Ukraine. It belongs to Nova Basan rural hromada.

== History ==
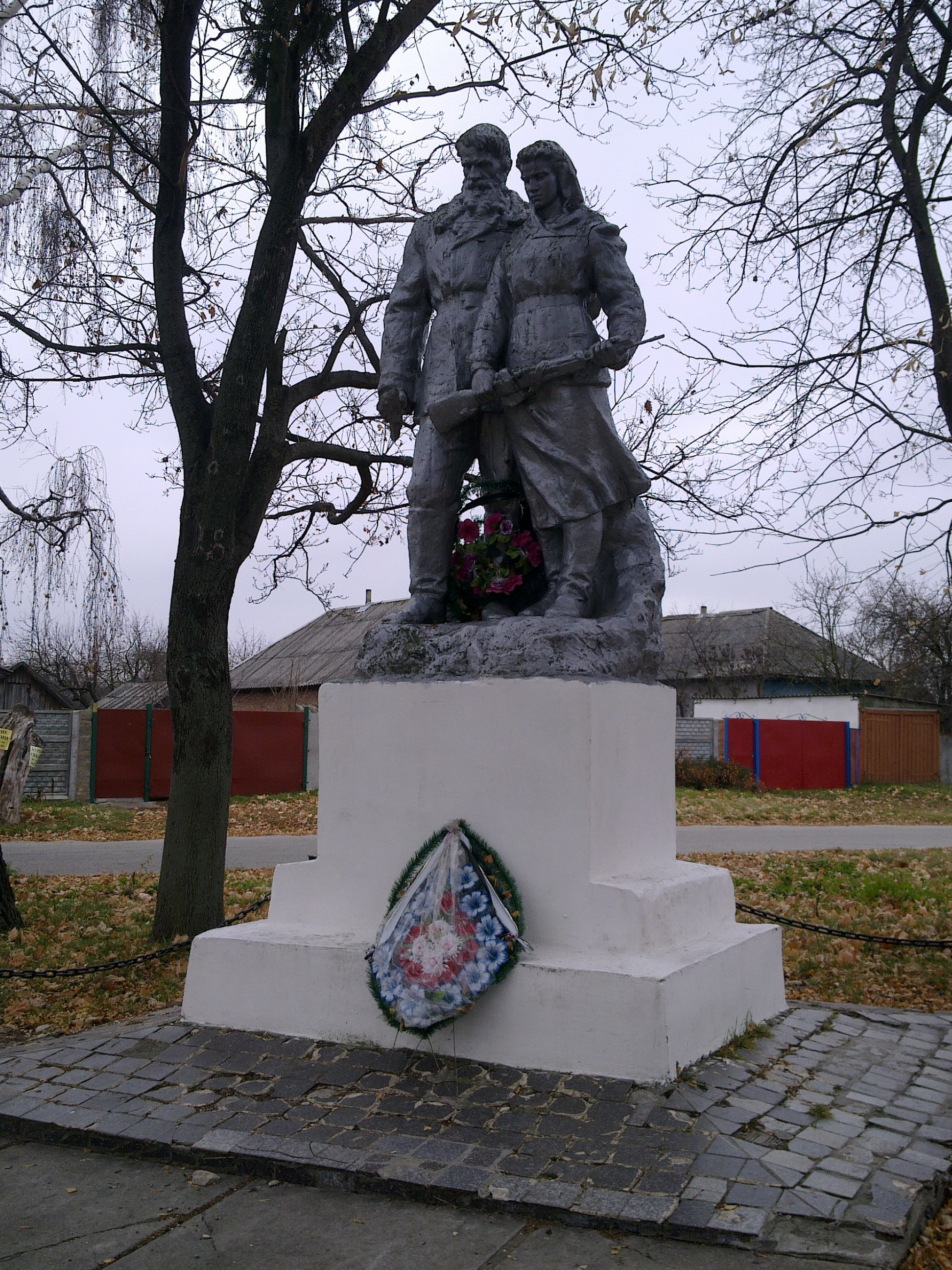
Monument to World War II partisans in Mochalyshche

It is unclear when exactly Mochalyshche was established. Information published by the Ukrainian Verkhovna Rada attests to its founding by the first decade of the 1800s. The village was likely founded during the Hetman administration, with the oldest mention of the village dating to the 1781 index of the Kievan viceroyalty, mentioning a village of 4 pospolite households named Mochalinskom (Russian: Мочалинскомъ), in Basan Stonia, Pereyaslav Regiment.^{:97} Its first emergence on a map was in 1801, appearing in the Russian Empire's Stolistovaya Karta (Russian: Столистовая карта, meaning "100-sheet map").

Under the administration of the Kievan viceroyalty, and the later Chernigov Governorate, Mochalyshche was in the third Stan of Kozeletsky Uyezd; in Yaroslavl Volost.^{:97}

The village was recorded in the 1866 Russian Empire's list of settlements. It was documented as comprising 22 homesteads housing a population of 181, whose water supply came from local wells. The 1902 list of inhabited places of the Chernigov Governorate mentions that by then the village's population had grown to 538.

In 1919, during the Ukrainian War of Independence, a Petliurite insurrection against the White Army broke out in Kozeletsky Uyezd, led by Ataman Romashka Demid Ostapovich. During this time, an armistice was in effect between the Petliurites and the Red Army, and they co-operated in order to disrupt Denikinite hegemony in Ukraine. After the White Army was expelled from the region in early 1920, Romashka's forces gained control over Mochalyshche and the rest of southern Kozeletsky Uyezd by resuming the fight against the Soviets. After continued fighting against the Red Army, the last of Romashka's forces were defeated on 16 May 1920 by the Bashkir Cavalry Brigade; Romashka managed to escape, but was later killed on 8 July by his godfather and compatriot, Stepan Shuplik, a native of Mochalyshche who acted as a double-agent for the Ukrainian Cheka.

During World War II, Mochalyshche was razed as part of Nazi punitive expedition against local partisan activity. The village was burnt to the ground on 18 December 1942, resulting in the death of 267 civilians.^{:28}

The village was reportedly resettled by 1978, as it was documented in a Soviet General Staff map of the area surrounding Kiev. (Note: Although this edition dates to 1981, the map specifies it was compiled according to an earlier 1964–1965 edition with additional corrections according to cartographic materials from 1974–1978.) Following Mochalyshche's resettlement, the 1989 Soviet census reported a population of 145.

Mochalyshche was under the administration of Sokolivka rural council in Bobrovytsia Raion until 2020; Administrative reforms in Chernihiv Oblast in June led to the merger of Sokolivka rural council with several other rural councils, including those of Nova Basan, Bilotserkivtsi, Vepryk, Voronky, and Novyi Bykiv, forming Nova Basan rural hromada.^{:2-3} Subsequent national administrative reform in July led to the merging of Bobrovytsia Raion with other districts to form the new Nizhyn Raion.

== Demographics ==
Demographic statistics published by the Ukrainian Verkhovna Rada show that as of 2012 the population of Mochalyshche was 141 people. Between the 2001 Ukrainian Census and 2012, the population increased by 0.7%, or one resident. However, since 1989, the population has declined by 2.76%, or four residents.

=== Language ===
According to the 2001 Ukrainian census, Ukrainian was the native language of 97.16% of the village's population, or 136 residents. Russian was the native language of the remaining portion of the population, who accounted for 2.84%, or 4 residents.

== Notable people ==
- Anatolii Pohribnyi, a Ukrainian politician, writer, and philologist.^{:67-80}
- Stepan Maximovich Shuplik, a Ukrainian poet,^{:13} Soviet partisan,^{:202-204} and former agent of the All-Ukrainian Extraordinary Commission.
