= Oleksandr Kryvets =

Soviet partisan (1919–1992)

Oleksandr Yeliseiovych Kryvets (Ukrainian: Олександр Єлісейович Кривець; September 12, 1919 – January 27, 1992) was a Soviet partisan leader in the German-occupied Ukraine during the World War II. For his participation in the combat operations, he was awarded the title of the Hero of the Soviet Union in 1944. His hero title was revoked in 1980 due to political controversy, but was reinstated in 1991.

== Biography ==
Kryvets was born on September 12, 1919, in the village of Pisky, in what today is Nizhyn Raion of the Chernihiv Oblast of Ukraine. He was enrolled in the local elementary and middle school in 1927. In 1934, following the completion of his studies, he enrolled in the year-long preparatory courses at the Ministry of Food Industry's Bila Tserkva Agricultural Institute of Sugar Production, where from 1935 to 1940 he would attend classes in the school's agronomy department. In 1936, he became a trade-union member and a member of the Komsomol. Finishing his studies at the institute in 1940, he then followed the call of the Komsomol's central committee and volunteered to study at the Moscow Red Star Military College of Aviation Technology (Russian: Московское Военное Краснозвёздное авиационное техническое училище). There, his focus was on the use of air-navigation equipment in military planes, and he graduated with distinction in 1941, qualifying as an aircraft technician and receiving the title of Sergeant.

=== World War II ===
Being a top student, he was given the right of choosing where to serve, and was sent to the 254th aviation regiment of the 36th aviation division, where he was to be a squadron technician and to work with the planes' air-navigation equipment. In August 1941, the regiment's commander, P. M. Petrov, officially granted Krivets the military title of Technician-Lieutenant (техник-лейтенант) – he would later be granted the title of Captain in 1944. The division was based in Kiev, but the regiment was soon deployed to the airfield by the village of Vil’shanka, in Vasylkiv Raion. It was deployed many times thereafter, and with the front's approach was rebased close to the city of Yahotyn, in the Kiev Oblast. It was there that, as part of the Southwestern Front, the regiment found itself caught in the great encirclement of Kiev, with the regiment headquarters and its archives destroyed as a result.

Attempts to escape the encirclement were unsuccessful. In November 1941, Kryvets was able to make it out and reach Pisky, where in the December of the same year there was created an anti-fascist underground organization to prepare for open, armed partisan warfare in the Nova Basan’ Raion. The organization consisted of 35 people and was led by I. A. Golovko, with Kryvets acting as his deputy. By March 1942, the group completed its collection and organization of weapons, ammunition, messengers, and secret meeting places, and in the November of that year was given the name “the Shchors detachment”. Kryvets was elected as the detachment's commander during its general assembly, with I. Golovko and I. Sidorenko chosen as the commissioner and chief of staff, respectively. According to the German war archives, the partisan group started actively carrying out military operations in the beginning of July 1942. In its attempts to destroy the detachment, the Wehrmacht would organize a series of large-scale roundups with the use of both ground and air forces. According to the reports delivered to the operational-rear commander of Army Group South by the forces of the SD, SS, gendarmerie, and various garrison command centers:

“It is becoming more and more evident that the bands in the region to the north of Kiev benefit from military organization. The 213th Security Division is currently using a strengthened battalion to carry out an operation in the Nova Basan’ region, after which, from July 27 on, there will follow a joint action on the part of the 213th Rear-Security Division and the Hungarian 8th Rear-Security Army in the region to the northeast of Kobyzhcha.

Kryvets had been arrested in March 1942. Two days later, he would be taken out under police escort to be delivered to the Gestapo, but would be rescued by his comrades while en route. On July 15, 1942, the following report was delivered to the operational-rear commander of Army Group South:

“The partisans are in Pisky, 10 kilometers northwest of Nova Basan’, in the Chernihiv Oblast. Six armed partisans burst in on the starosta in Pisky... One member of the police was injured, another one killed. The partisans escaped. The gendarmerie of Bobrovytsia was able to establish their surnames. Their family members were arrested. The investigation is ongoing.”

Under the direction of the regional mayor, I. L. Dyachenko, who also headed the police in Nova Basan and Pisky, the partisans’ relatives were arrested for having connections to and aiding the partisan detachment, and were then executed. Among them were Kryvets' father and sixteen-year-old brother (according to the Bobrovytsia regional archives, the father and brother were not executed but sent to work in Germany). The partisans’ attempts to capture the mayor were not successful. Later that year, he disappeared without a trace. The detachment grew quickly. By the end of 1942, it already counted 117 members (according to data from the archives, however, the detachment only had 35-40 members as of January 1, 1943). According to the German June 1943 reports:

“The northern part of the operative region of the Pereyaslav local command center is under strengthened offensives from two partisan detachments. Presumably, they have connections to Kohan’s motorized band, part of which is located beyond the operational-rear region under and north of Nova Basan’ [....] Army Group Centre does not have the strength and means to destroy this band in joint effort with the forces of the operational-rear region [....] Kohan's motorized detachment, which carries out some of its actions in regions north of the Nova Basan’ settlement and outside Army Group South's operational zone, is delivering all-out attacks on the garrison command centers with the use of vehicles that they have, through persistent raids, seized from our rear units.”

"Kohan" was one of Kryvets’ aliases. According to the commander of the partisan detachment formation in the Kiev Oblast, I. F. Cheburnov – the Communist Party of Ukraine (CPU) central committee’s authorized representative on the occupied territory – the Shchors detachment acted heroically throughout 1943, all the way up to its joining with the subdivisions of the Red Army in the September of that year. Information regarding the military and political work of the detachment are available in the detachment’s own records, which were verified and stored in the CPU central committee’s Ukrainian Partisan Movement Headquarters and Marx-Lenin Institute archives.

A significant portion of the partisans (approximately 200 fighters) received government awards for their courage and valor in the battle against the Germans. On January 4, 1944, the Presidium of the Supreme Soviet of the USSR issued Kryvets, the detachment’s commander, the title of Hero of the Soviet Union, presenting him with the Order of Bogdan Khmelnitsky and the Gold Star, for his “exemplary execution of commanding duties against the enemy’s rear in the battle against the German fascist invaders, bravery and heroism, and major contributions to the development of the partisan movement in Ukraine.”

=== Post-War ===
On August 21, 1943, the USSR Council of People's Commissars and the Communist Party of the Soviet Union's (CPSU) Central Committee issued a resolution “with regard to certain measures related to the restoration of the national economy in regions liberated from the German occupation”. As a result, in the beginning of 1944, Kryvets – under the orders of the CPU central committee – was sent to assist with the restoration of a Smila sugar refinery, where he was appointed as the director. Later, he would serve as the director of the sugar refineries in Horodyshche-Pustovarivs’ke and Talne. He would also, from 1950 on, serve as the deputy head of the Ukrainian SSR’s Main Directorate of Sugar Production and, after the directorate’s reform, would serve continuously from 1953 to 1980 as the deputy manager of the Kiev beet sugar trust – serving as the trust’s chief agronomist, manager, and, following the reorganization of the trust into an association, the general director of the Kiev Sahprom association. From 1982, he would work as a senior researcher at the All-Union Scientific Research Institute of Sugar Beet. In 1945, Kryvets was a delegate to the first World Federation of Democratic Youth, held in London, where he was the flag bearer for the Ukrainian SSR during the opening ceremony in the Royal Albert Hall.

He was a member of the Communist Party from 1945, and would be elected to serve as a deputy of the Supreme Soviet of the Ukrainian SSR. For many years, he would be elected both as an alternate and a member of the Kiev Regional Committee of the Communist Party of Ukraine and as a member of the Kiev Oblast Soviet of People’s Deputies. He successfully defended his dissertation and in 1974 was awarded the Candidate of Sciences in Economics by the USSR Council of Ministers’ Higher Attestation Commission. He would publish a total of ten academic works. In 1973, he published his memoirs in a novel titled Via Crimson Roads (Багряными дорогами), written in Ukrainian.

== Stripping and return of the Hero of the Soviet Union title ==
In 1978, the Moscow writer Arkadiy Yakovlevich Sahnin invited Kryvets for a meeting, having introduced himself as a special correspondent of the newspaper Pravda. The meeting took place in July in the Kiev hotel “Teatralnaya”, where Sahnin informed that there were insistent demands from comrades in the CPSU central committee apparatus to have Dyachenko's image rehabilitated – namely, they wanted him declared as having been one of the members of the partisan underground. The pressure stemmed from his influential relatives, whose advancement up the career ladder was being hindered by his past connections with the occupational forces. In 1979 and 1980, articles published in Literaturnaya Gazeta exposed Kryvets' reportedly false claims about the actions of the partisan detachment. Soon, the CPSU central committee's Central Control Commission of the Communist Party of the Soviet Union (KPK) received a phone call from the general secretary, after which Kryvets was summoned to a KPK meeting. The commission would investigate the relevant documents and collect information about Kryvets from eyewitnesses and other members of the partisan movement. Consequently, he was expelled from the Party, with the decree to strip Kryvets of the Hero of the Soviet Union title and the Order of Bohdan Khmelnitsky, signed by the Presidium of the Supreme Soviet of the USSR a few days later (effective February 28, 1980).

The battle for the honor of the Shchors detachment partisans, dead and alive, went on for over a decade. In the end, a group of former partisans turned to the People's Court of Moscow's Sokolniki District to take legal action against Sahnin and the editorial board of Literaturnaya Gazeta. The court accepted the accusations, found them to be just, and obligated Literaturnaya Gazeta to openly refute the previous articles. On September 15, 1991, the newspaper informed its readers, in its “Rights and Morals” (Мораль и право) section, that what was presented in the articles of 1979 and 1980 did not match reality. The author of the articles and the newspaper's editorial board presented their apologies. Under the decree issued by the president of the USSR and effective on July 16, 1991, the Presidium's decree of February 28, 1980, stripping Kryvets of the Hero of the Soviet Union title was annulled. On August 29, the head of the secretariat of the Armed Forces of Ukraine (ZSU) N. G. Homenko handed to Kryvets the Order of Lenin, the Order of Bohdan Khmelnitsky, First Class, the Gold Star, the Hero of the Soviet Union certificate and booklet, and his booklet of awards.

Kryvets died on January 27, 1992. He was buried with military rites in the Baikove Cemetery.

== Legacy ==
In the memorial complex “National Museum of the History of Ukraine in the Second World War" in Kiev, there is an exhibition with a stand dedicated to “Alexander Yeliseyevich Krivets, Hero of the Soviet Union”.

== Awards ==
- Gold Star of the Hero of the Soviet Union (1944)
- Order of Lenin (1944)
- Order of Bohdan Khmelnitsky, First Class (1945)
- Order of the Badge of Honour (thrice – 1958, 1966, 1973)
- Certificate of Honor from the Presidium of the Supreme Soviet of the Ukrainian SSR (Russian: Почётная грамота Президиума Верховного Совета УССР) (1969)
- Order of the October Revolution (1971)
- Medal "To a Partisan of the Patriotic War" (Russian: Медаль «Партизану Отечественной войны»), First Class (1944)
- Medal "For the Victory over Germany in the Great Patriotic War 1941–1945" (Russian: Медаль «За победу над Германией») (1945)
- “Valiant Labor in the Great Patriotic War” Medal (Russian: Медаль «За доблестный труд в Великой Отечественной войне») (1946)
- Medal "For the Defence of Kiev" (Russian: Медаль «За оборону Киева») (1964)
- “Twenty Year Anniversary of the Victory in the Great Patriotic War” Medal (Russian: Медаль «20 лет Победы в Великой Отечественной войне») (1965)
- Jubilee Medal "50 Years of the Armed Forces of the USSR" (Russian: Медаль «50 лет Вооружённых Сил СССР») (1968)
- Jubilee Medal "In Commemoration of the 100th Anniversary of the Birth of Vladimir Ilyich Lenin" (Russian: Медаль «В ознаменование 100-летия со дня рождения Владимира Ильича Ленина») (1970)
- “Twenty-Five Year Anniversary of the Victory in the Great Patriotic War” Medal (Russian: Медаль «25 лет Победы в Великой Отечественной войне») (1970)
- “Thirty Year Anniversary of the Victory in the Great Patriotic War of 1941-1945” Medal (Russian: Медаль «30 лет Победы в Великой Отечественной войне 1941—1945 гг.») (1975)
- USSR VDNH Silver Medal (twice – 1967, 1970)
- USSR VDNH Gold Medal (1974)
- “Top Performer in the USSR Ministry of Food Production’s Socialist emulation” Badge (Russian: Знак «Отличник Социалистического соревнования МПП СССР») (twice – 1973, 1975)
- “Udarnik of the Ninth Five-Year Plan” Badge (Russian: Знак «Ударник 9-й пятилетки») (1975)
- Order of the Red Banner of Labour (1977)
