= Staryi Bykiv =

Rural locality in Chernihiv Oblast, Ukraine

Staryi Bykiv Старий Биків
- Village
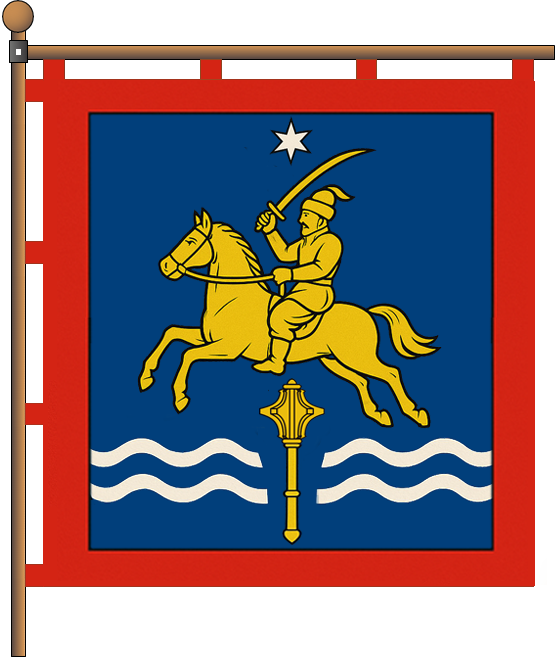
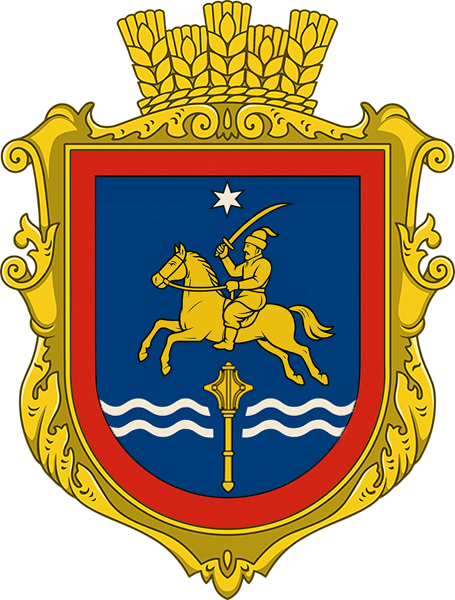
- Flag Coat of arms

- Location of Staryi Bykiv Staryi Bykiv (Ukraine)
- Coordinates: 50°35′38″N 31°38′25″E
- Country: Ukraine
- Oblast: Chernihiv Oblast
- District: Nizhyn Raion
- Founded: 1564

Area
  - Total: 3.021 km^{2} (1.166 sq mi)
- Elevation: 127 m (417 ft)

Population (2017)
  - Total: 469
  - Density: 155/km^{2} (402/sq mi)
- Time zone: UTC+2 (EET)
  - Summer (DST): UTC+3 (EEST)
- Postal code: 17453
- Area code: +380 4632

Staryi Bykiv (Ukrainian: Старий Биків) is a village in Nizhyn Raion in Chernihiv Oblast of northern Ukraine. It belongs to Nova Basan rural hromada, one of the hromadas of Ukraine.

Staryi Bykiv was previously located in Bobrovytsia Raion until it was abolished on 18 July 2020 as part of the administrative reform of Ukraine, which reduced the number of raions of Chernihiv Oblast to five. The area of Bobrovytsia Raion was merged into Nizhyn Raion.

It was captured by Russian forces during the 2022 Russian invasion of Ukraine.On 27 February Russian troops destroyed the bridge between Staryi Bykiv and Novyi Bykiv, proceeding to enter the village. According to Human Rights Watch, Russian then rounded up six male villagers and had them summarily executed. The villagers' bodies were allowed to be buried in 7 March.

The soldiers left on 31 March. The Guardian said that three or four additional executions had taken place and that the local school had been destroyed. Much of the property in Staryi Bykiv and Novyi Bykiv was damaged or destroyed.

== Population ==
=== Language ===
Distribution of the population by native language according to the 2001 census:

| Language | Percentage |
|---|---|
| Ukrainian | 98.55% |
| Russian | 1.13% |
| other/undecided | 0.32% |
