= Krivets =

Krivets may refer to:

- Krivets, Cherepovetsky District, Vologda Oblast,
- Sergey Krivets, Belarusian former professional footballer
- Oleksandr Kryvets, Hero of the Soviet Union and a participant in the Soviet partisan movement during World War II

== See also ==
- Krivtsy
