= Kobyzhcha =

- Village
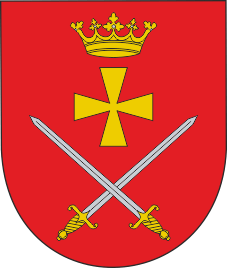
- Coat of arms

- Location within Chernihiv Oblast Location within Ukraine
- Coordinates: 50°49′N 31°30′E
- Country: Ukraine
- Oblast: Chernihiv Oblast
- Raion: Nizhyn Raion
- Hromada: Bobrovytsia urban hromada
- Founded: 1100

Government
  - Mayor: Volodymyr Mykhailovych Poddubnyi

Area
  - Total: 0.017 km^{2} (0.0066 sq mi)
- Elevation: 423 m (1,388 ft)

Population (2025)
  - Total: ▼3,921
  - Density: 255,840/km^{2} (662,600/sq mi)
- Postal code: 17411
- Website: Verkhovna Rada website

Kobyzhcha (Ukrainian: Кобижча; Russian: Кобыжча) is a village in Nizhyn Raion (district) of Chernihiv Oblast (province) in northern Ukraine. It belongs to Bobrovytsia urban hromada, one of the hromadas of Ukraine. The village is located on the Trubizh River, a left tributary of the Dnipro.

Kobyzhcha was first founded in 1100. It is located near the Kobyzhcha railway station, the second railroad station in the entire district.

Until 18 July 2020, Kobyzhcha belonged to Bobrovytsia Raion. The raion was abolished in July 2020 as part of the administrative reform of Ukraine, which reduced the number of raions of Chernihiv Oblast to five. The area of Bobrovytsia Raion was merged into Nizhyn Raion.
