= Martin Latsis =

Latvian communist politician

- Мартын Лацис
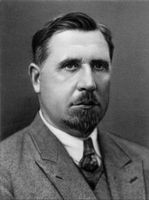
- Latsis in 1926

Chairman of the Red Army Cheka (Eastern Front)
- In office July 1918 – November 1918

Chairman of the All-Ukrainian Cheka
- In office April 2, 1919 – August 16, 1919
- Preceded by: Isaak Shvarts
- Succeeded by: Vasiliy Mantsev

Chairman of Cheka in Kiev Governorate
- In office August 1919 – September 1919

Director of Plekhanov Institute of People's Economy
- In office 1932–1937

Personal details
- Born: December 16, 1888 Ragaini, Wenden County, Governorate of Livonia, Russian Empire
- Died: March 20, 1938 (aged 49) Moscow, Russian SFSR, Soviet Union
- Party: RSDLP (Bolsheviks) (1905–1918); Russian Communist Party (1918–1937)

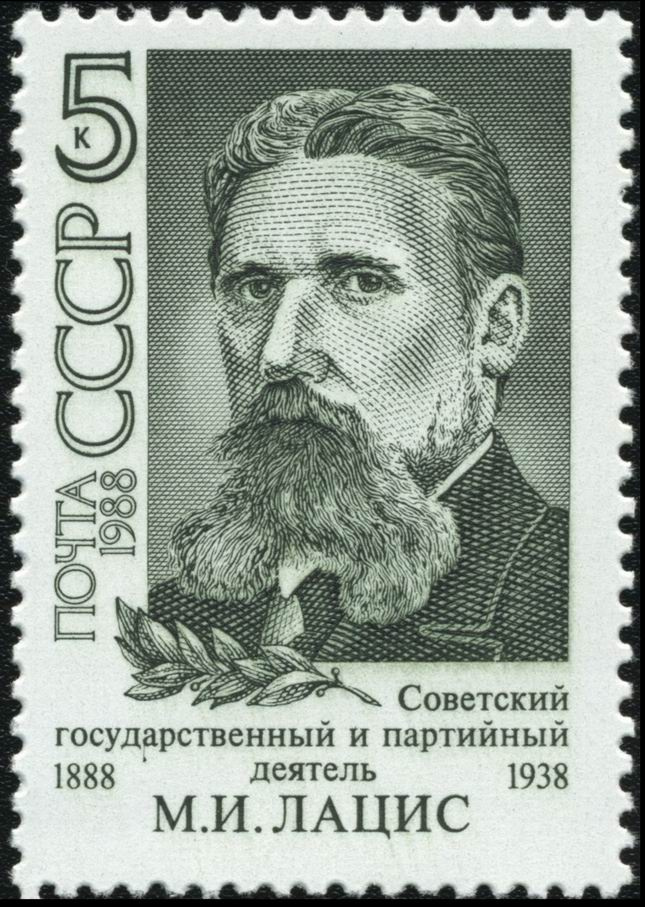
Postage stamp, USSR (1988)

Martin Ivanovich Latsis (Russian: Мартын Иванович Лацис; Latvian: Mārtiņš Lācis; born Jānis Sudrabs; Russian: Ян Фридрихович Судрабс, romanized: Yan Fridrikhovich Sudrabs; December 14, 1888 – February 11, 1938) was a Latvian Bolshevik revolutionary, Soviet politician, and senior state security officer of the Cheka from Courland (now Latvia).

== Life ==
Born in the family of a Latvian farmworker, Latsis was a member of the Bolshevik faction of the Russian Social Democratic Labour Party from 1905 (an "Old Bolshevik"), an active participant in the Russian Revolutions of 1905–1907 and 1917, a member of the Military Revolutionary Committee, a member of the Collegium of the All-Russia Cheka (1918–1921) and Chairman of the Cheka in Ukraine (1919), and a member of VTsIK. Between 1932 and 1937, Latsis was a director at the Plekhanov Moscow Institute of the National Economy.

Latsis was the author of the book Dva goda borby na vnutrennom fronte ("Two Years of Struggle on the Internal Front", Moscow: Gos. izd-vo, 1920), in which he advocated unrestrained violence against class enemies. He boasted of the harsh repressive policies used by the Cheka.

In 1918, while a deputy chief of the Cheka in Ukraine, he called for sentences to be determined not by guilt or innocence but by social class. He is quoted as explaining the Red Terror as follows:

We are not fighting against single individuals. We are exterminating the bourgeoisie as a class. Do not look in materials you have gathered for evidence that a suspect acted or spoke against the Soviet authorities. The first question you should ask him is what class he belongs to, what is his origin, education, profession. These questions should determine his fate. This is the essence of the Red Terror.

While praising Latsis' abilities, Lenin criticized his advocacy of indiscriminate class terror as "absurd" and risking "untold harm to communism":

Political distrust means we must not put non-Soviet people in politically responsible posts. It means the Cheka must keep a sharp eye on members of classes, sections or groups that have leanings towards the white guards. (Though, incidentally, one need not go to the same absurd lengths as Comrade Latsis, one of our finest, tried and tested Communists, did in his Kazan magazine, Krasny Terror. He wanted to say that Red terror meant the forcible suppression of exploiters who attempted to restore their rule, but instead, he put it this way [on page 2 of the first issue of his magazine]: “Don't search [!!?] the records for evidence of whether his revolt against the Soviet was an armed or only a verbal one”) ... Political distrust of the members of a bourgeois apparatus is legitimate and essential. But to refuse to use them in administration and construction would be the height of folly, fraught with untold harm to communism.

On November 29, 1937, during the so-called "Latvian Operation", Latsis was arrested, accused by a commission of NKVD and Prosecutor of the USSR of belonging to a "counter-revolutionary, nationalist organization" and executed in 1938 by shooting in the Butovo firing range.

In 1956, the Military Collegiate of the Supreme Court of USSR politically rehabilitated him.

== Literature ==
- Solzhenitsyn, Aleksandr; The Gulag Archipelago, Harper & Row, 660 pp., ISBN 0-06-080332-0.
- Gordievsky, Oleg; Andrew, Christopher, KGB: The Inside Story (1990), Hodder & Stoughton. ISBN 0-340-48561-2.
