= List of cities in Chernihiv Oblast =

Location of cities in Chernihiv Oblast

There are 16 populated places in Chernihiv Oblast, Ukraine, that have been officially granted city status (Ukrainian: місто, romanized: misto) by the Verkhovna Rada, the country's parliament. Settlements with more than 10,000 people are eligible for city status, although the status is typically also granted to settlements of historical or regional importance. As of 5 December 2001, the date of the first and only official census in the country since independence, (Note: As of 11 July 2023) the most populous city in the oblast was the regional capital, Chernihiv, with a population of 304,994 people, while the least populous city was Baturyn, with 3,078 people. Following the passing of decommunization laws, one city within the oblast, Snovsk, was renamed in 2016 from its previous name, Shchors, for its connection with people, places, events, and organizations associated with the Soviet Union. For its contributions to the country's defense during the Russian invasion, one city in the oblast, Chernihiv, was awarded with the honorary title Hero City of Ukraine in 2022.

From independence in 1991 to 2020, four cities in the oblast were designated as cities of regional significance (municipalities), which had self-government under city councils, while the oblast's remaining 12 cities were located in 22 raions (districts) as cities of district significance, which are subordinated to the governments of the raions. On 18 July 2020, an administrative reform abolished and merged the oblast's raions and cities of regional significance into five new, expanded raions. The five raions that make up the oblast are Chernihiv, Koriukivka, Nizhyn, Novhorod-Siverskyi, and Pryluky.

== List of cities ==
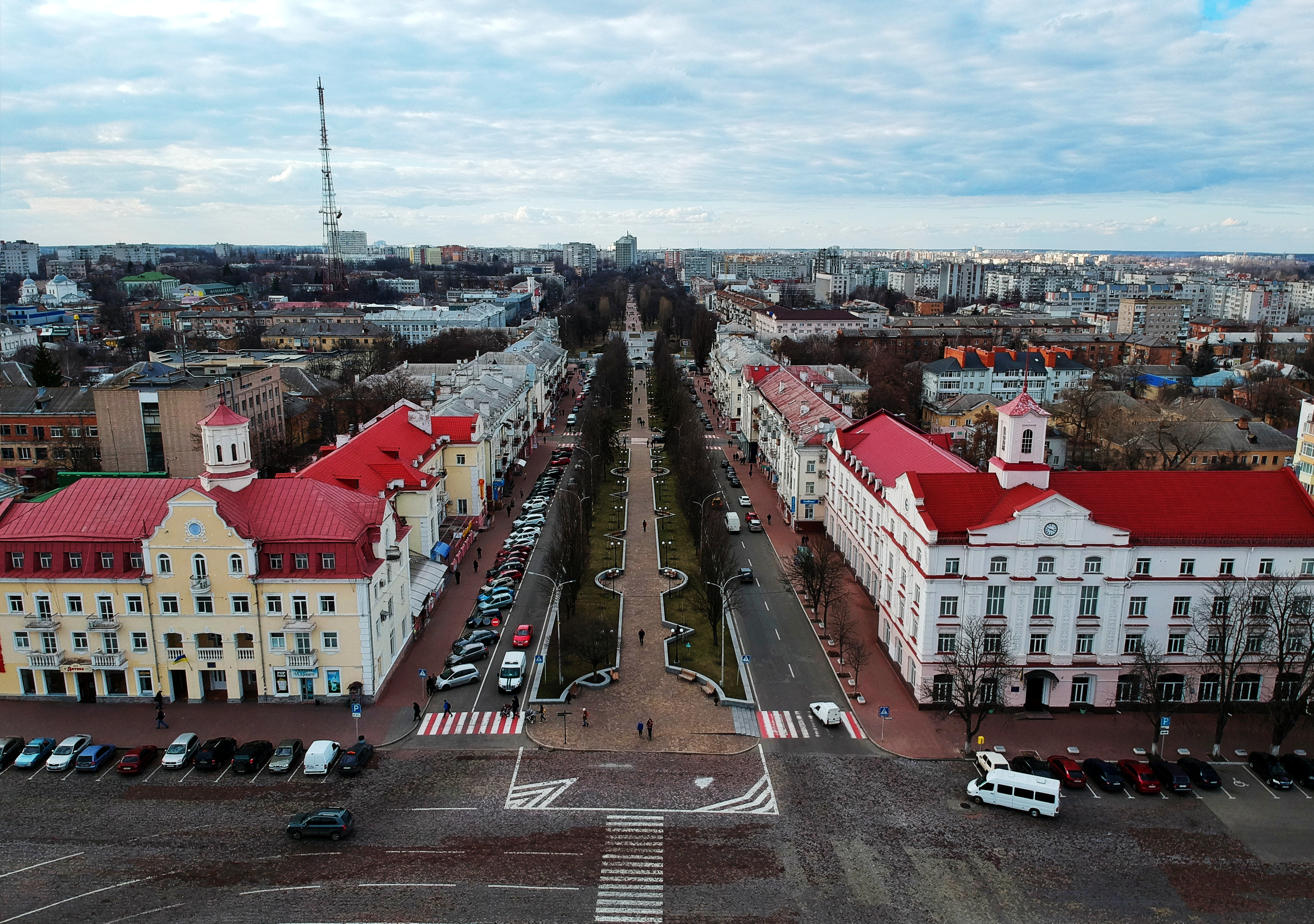
Chernihiv, capital and most populous city in Chernihiv Oblast

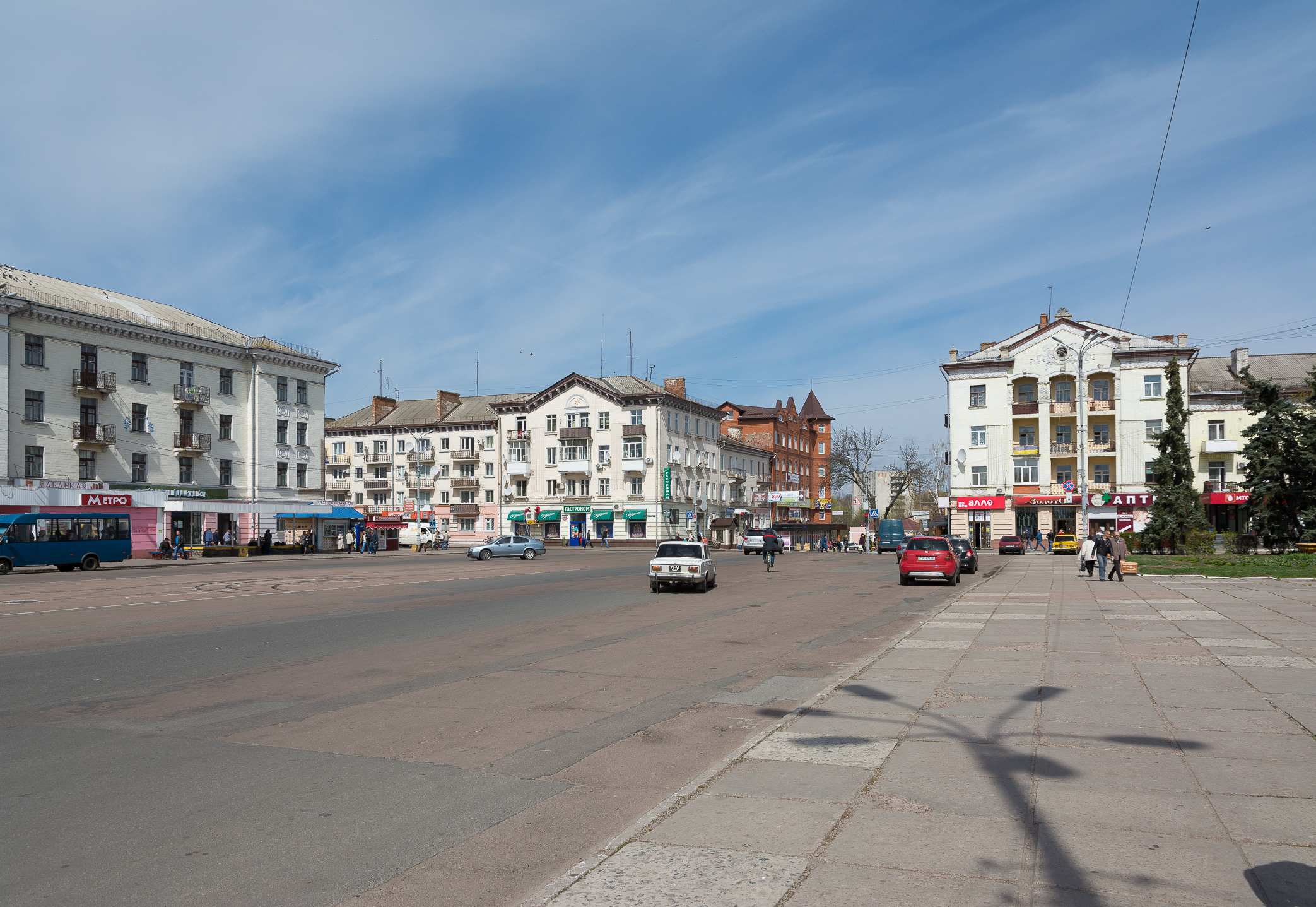
Nizhyn, second most populous city in the oblast and the site of numerous Ukrainian Baroque churches

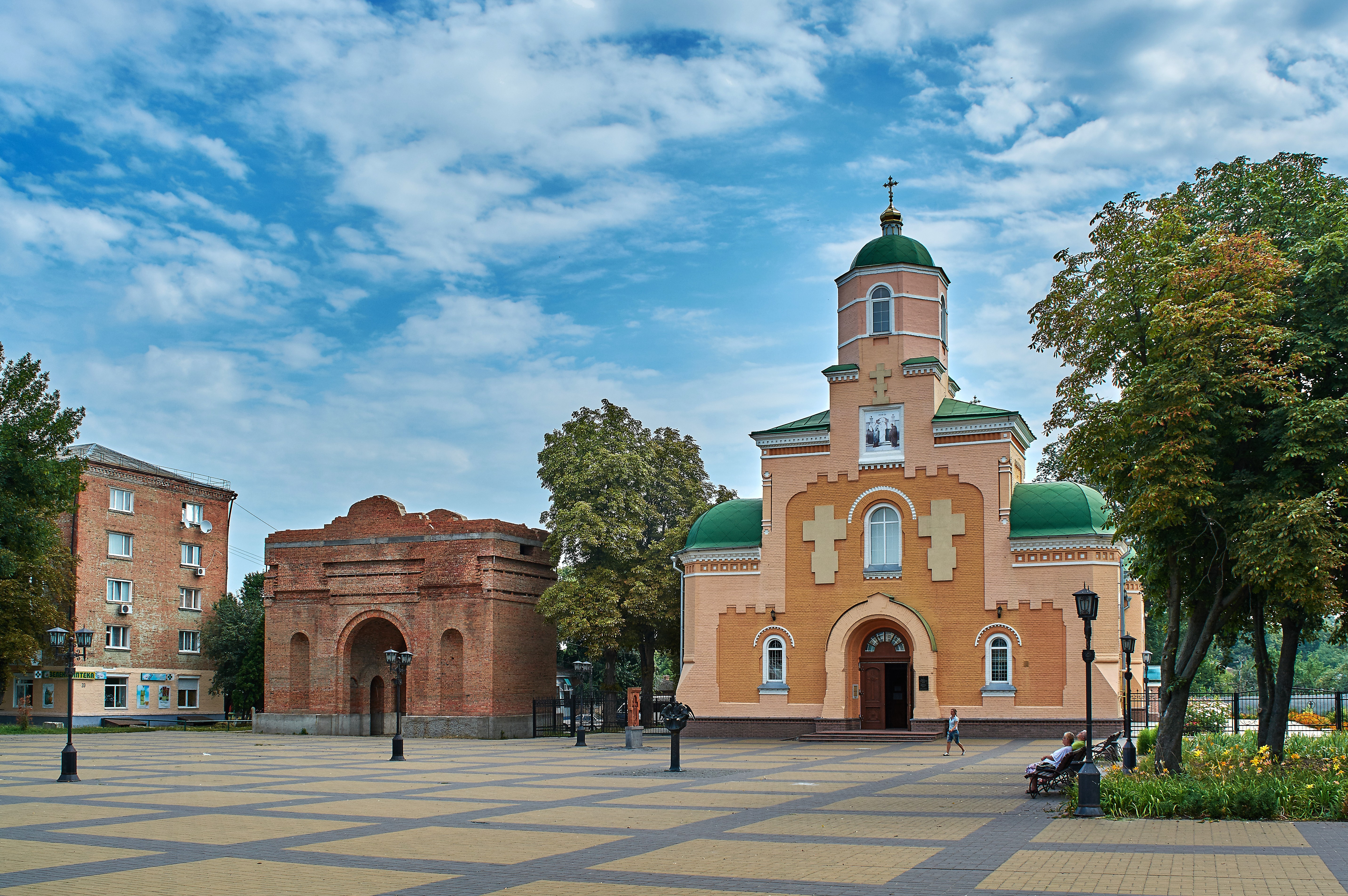
Pryluky, third most populous city and a minor industrial center

Cities in Chernihiv Oblast
| Name | Name (in Ukrainian) (Note: Links to the Ukrainian Wikipedia articles for each city) | Raion (district) | Population (2022 estimates) | Population (2001 census) | Population change |
|---|---|---|---|---|---|
| Bakhmach | Бахмач | Nizhyn | 16,862 | 23,417 | −27.99% |
| Baturyn | Батурин | Nizhyn | 2,406 | 3,078 | −21.83% |
| Bobrovytsia | Бобровиця | Nizhyn | 10,541 | 11,916 | −11.54% |
| Borzna | Борзна | Nizhyn | 9,454 | 11,707 | −19.24% |
| Chernihiv | Чернігів | Chernihiv | 282,747 | 304,994 | −7.29% |
| Horodnia | Городня | Chernihiv | 11,506 | 14,043 | −18.07% |
| Ichnia | Ічня | Pryluky | 10,390 | 12,780 | −18.70% |
| Koriukivka | Корюківка | Koriukivka | 12,202 | 14,318 | −14.78% |
| Mena | Мена | Koriukivka | 10,935 | 12,940 | −15.49% |
| Nizhyn | Ніжин | Nizhyn | 65,830 | 76,625 | −14.09% |
| Nosivka | Носівка | Nizhyn | 12,908 | 15,966 | −19.15% |
| Novhorod-Siverskyi | Новгород-Сіверський | Novhorod-Siverskyi | 12,375 | 15,175 | −18.45% |
| Oster | Остер | Chernihiv | 5,564 | 7,194 | −22.66% |
| Pryluky | Прилуки | Pryluky | 51,637 | 64,861 | −20.39% |
| Semenivka | Семенівка | Novhorod-Siverskyi | 7,792 | 9,656 | −19.30% |
| Snovsk | Сновськ | Koriukivka | 10,620 | 12,315 | −13.76% |

== See also ==
- List of cities in Ukraine
