= Pisky, Chernihiv Oblast =

Pisky Піски
- Village
- Location within Chernihiv Oblast Location within Ukraine
- Coordinates: 50°35′53″N 31°22′53″E
- Country: Ukraine
- Oblast: Chernihiv Oblast
- Raion: Nizhyn Raion
- Established: 1650

Area
  - Total: 4 km^{2} (1.5 sq mi)

Population (2001)
  - Total: 712

Pisky (Ukrainian: Піски) is a selo of Nizhyn Raion in Chernihiv Oblast (province) of northern Ukraine. It belongs to Bobrovytsia urban hromada, one of the hromadas of Ukraine.

The name in Ukrainian can be interpreted literally as "the Sands". The village is famous for being the location where one of the most influential Ukrainian poets of the 1920s, Pavlo Tychyna, was born.

Until 18 July 2020, Pisky belonged to Bobrovytsia Raion. The raion was abolished in July 2020 as part of the administrative reform of Ukraine, which reduced the number of raions of Chernihiv Oblast to five. The area of Bobrovytsia Raion was merged into Nizhyn Raion.
