= Vilkhivka, Chernihiv Oblast =

Village in Chernihiv Oblast, Ukraine

Vilkhivka Вільхівка
- Village
- Interactive map of Vilkhivka
- Location of Vilkhivka Vilkhivka (Ukraine)
- Coordinates: 52°00′42″N 32°34′29″E
- Country: Ukraine
- Oblast: Chernihiv Oblast
- Raion: Novhorod-Siverskyi Raion
- Elevation: 172 m (564 ft)

Population (2001)
  - Total: 31
- Time zone: UTC+2
  - Summer (DST): UTC+3
- Postal code: 15461
- Area code: +380 6250

Vilkhivka (Ukrainian: Вільхівка) is a village in the Novhorod-Siverskyi Raion, Chernihiv Oblast (province) of northern Ukraine.

== Demographics ==
Native language as of the Ukrainian Census of 2001:

- Ukrainian 100%
