= Novyi Bykiv =

Novyi Bykiv Новий Биків
- Town
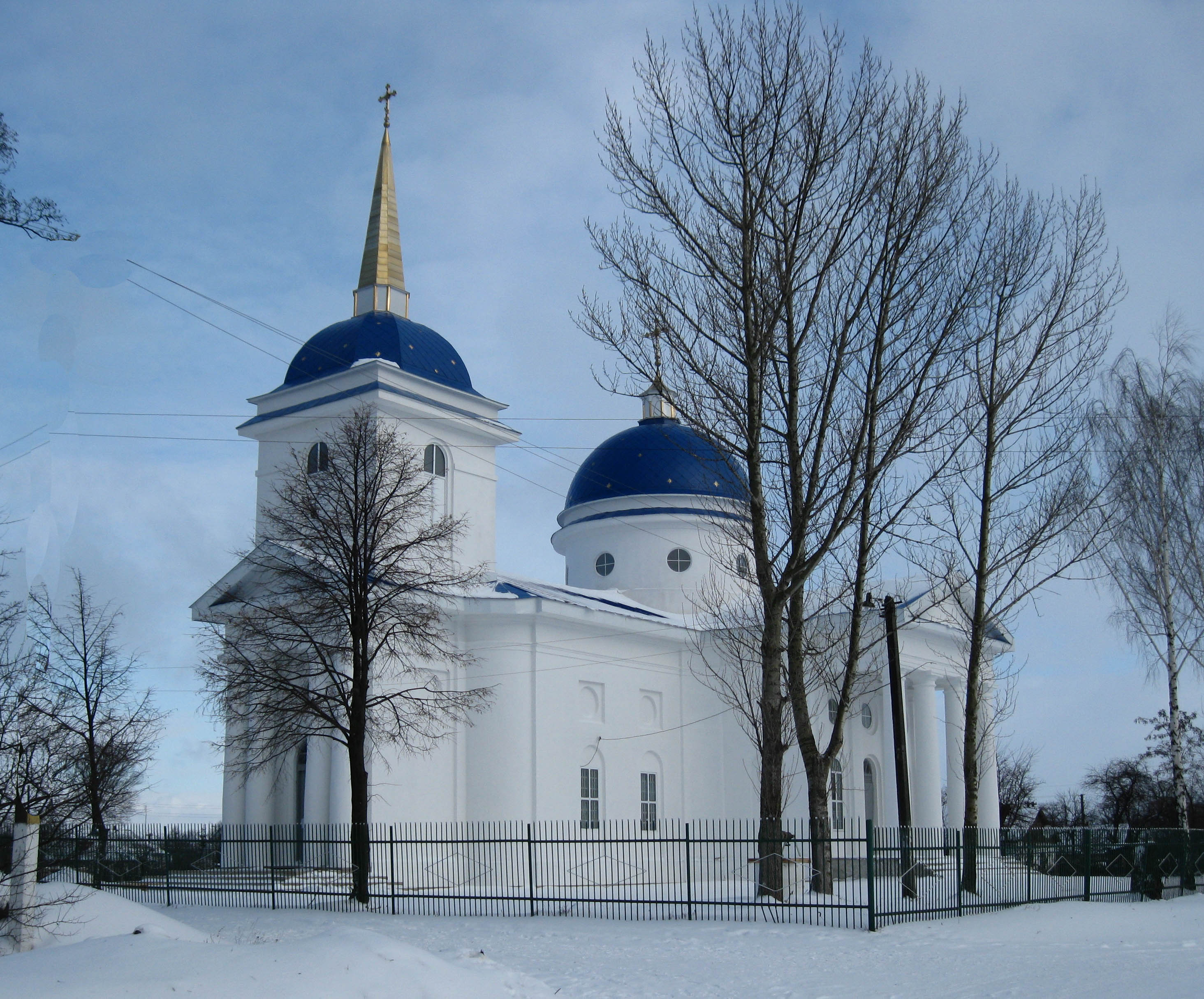
- Dormition Church

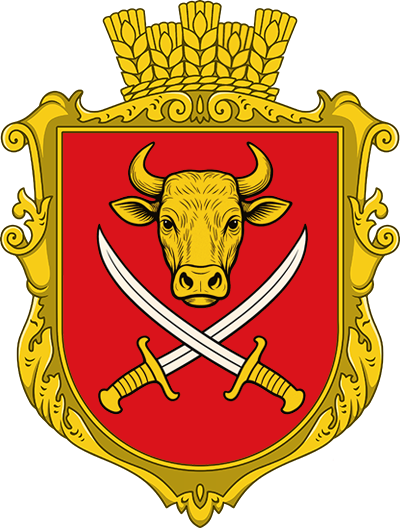
- Coat of arms

- Location within Chernihiv Oblast Location within Ukraine
- Coordinates: 50°35′39″N 31°39′58″E
- Country: Ukraine
- Oblast: Chernihiv Oblast
- Raion: Nizhyn Raion
- Founded: 11th century

Area
  - Total: 7,405 km^{2} (2,859 sq mi)
- Elevation: 129 m (423 ft)

Population (2006)
  - Total: 2,024
- Postal code: 17453
- Area code: +380 4632

Novyi Bykiv (Ukrainian: Новий Биків, Russian: Новый Быков, romanized: Novy Bykov) is a village in Nizhyn Raion of Chernihiv Oblast (province) of Ukraine. It belongs to Nova Basan rural hromada, one of the hromadas of Ukraine. Population is 2,024 (2006).

== History ==
The earliest known references on Novyi Bykiv is of 1621. The mounds of the Bronze Age (II millennium B.C.) and Gord of Kievan Rus' (11th century) were found near the village.

During the Second World War, the village was occupied by the troops of the Third Reich in 1941-1943. In the first days, the German occupiers, with the help of local collaborators ("policai"), shot members of the ruling party (at that time, the All-Union Communist Party (Bolsheviks)). The list of Novy Bykov residents who died in the German-Soviet war, on the stele in the center of the village, includes 422 people.

Until 18 July 2020, Novyi Bykiv belonged to Bobrovytsia Raion. The raion was abolished in July 2020 as part of the administrative reform of Ukraine, which reduced the number of raions of Chernihiv Oblast to five. The area of Bobrovytsia Raion was merged into Nizhyn Raion.

In 2022, during the Russian invasion of Ukraine, the village was occupied from February 26 to March 31. Russian military personnel committed a number of war crimes in the village: prohibition of people to move freely around the village, prohibition to bury the dead relatives in the cemetery, numerous cases of looting (robbery of shops and the population), destruction of housing and infrastructure (the school, hospital, kindergarten, filling station were destroyed or damaged), killing of at least three civilians, illegal capture of civilians. Victoria Andrusha (one of the two illegally captured persons) was released from captivity by exchange on September 29, 2022.

== Gallery ==
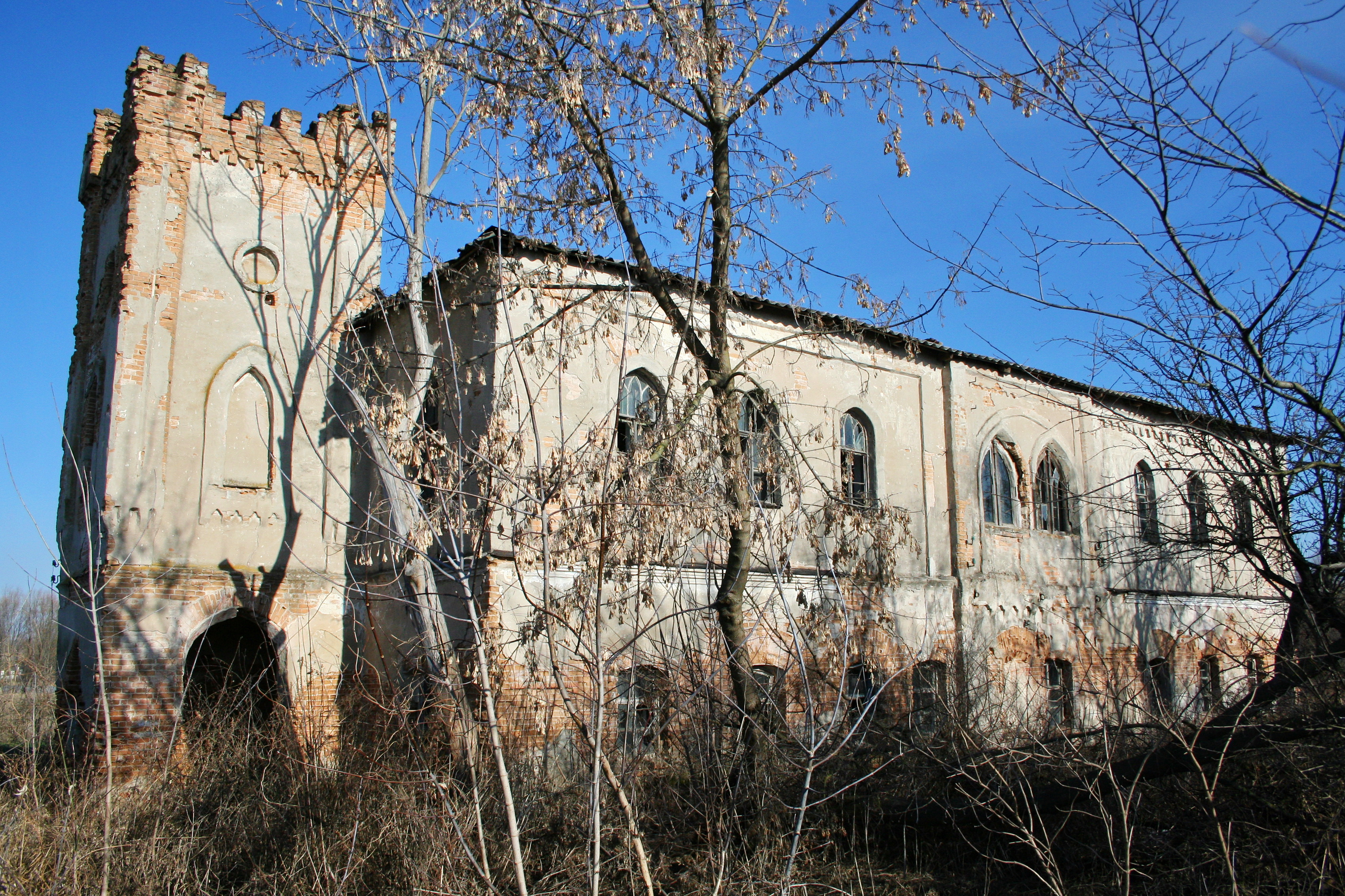
The Meyendorff estate

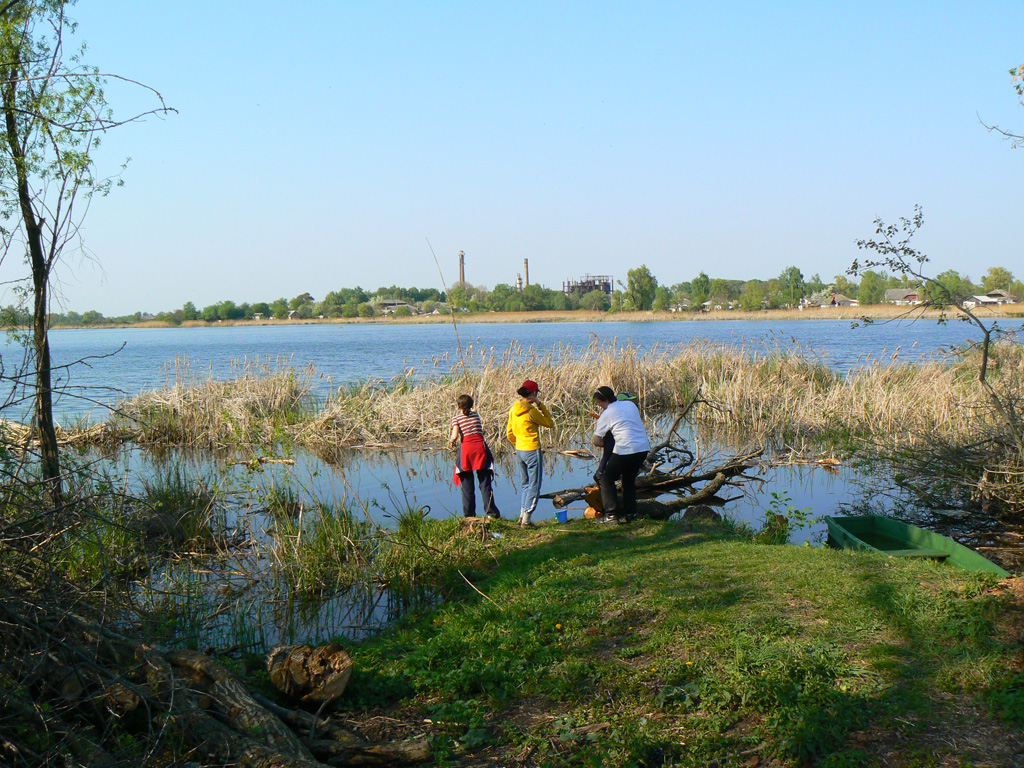
Supiy River
