= Vasiliy Mantsev =

Russian Communist Revolutionary (1889–1938)

- Василий Манцев

Chairman of the Ukrainian Cheka/GPU/OGPU
- In office 1919–1923
- Preceded by: Aleksandr Rotenberg
- Succeeded by: Vsevolod Balitsky

People's Commissar for Internal Affairs of the Ukrainian SSR
- In office March 22, 1922 – August, 1923
- Preceded by: Mykola Skrypnyk
- Succeeded by: Ivan Nikolayenko

Personal details
- Born: 5 March 1889 Moscow, Russian Empire
- Died: 19 August 1938 (aged 49) Moscow, Soviet Union
- Party: Communist Party of the Soviet Union
- Other political affiliations: Russian Social Democratic Labour Party (1906–1917)

Military service
- Allegiance: Russian Empire (1916–1917); Russian Soviet Federative Socialist Republic (1918–1922); Soviet Union (1922–1923)
- Years of service: 1916–1917; 1918–1923
- Battles/wars: Russian Civil War

Vasiliy Nikolayevich Mantsev (Russian: Василий Николаевич Манцев; 5 March 1889 – 19 August 1938) was a Russian revolutionary and high-ranking official of the Cheka.

== Early career ==
Mantsev was born in Moscow into a large family of Old Believers. His father was an office worker. He studied law at Moscow University, but did not graduate. He was active in the 1905 Revolution, joining the Bolshevik faction of the Russian Social Democratic Labour Party in 1906. After several arrests he was sent into internal exile, but in 1911 he escaped from Vladimir to France, and was a pupil at the school for revolutionaries that Vladimir Lenin had set up in Longjumeau. He returned to Moscow illegally in 1913, and was again arrested and exiled to Vologda Oblast. In 1916, he was called up for the Imperial Army.

== Career from 1917 ==
At the time of the February Revolution, Mantsev's infantry regiment was based in Rostov, in Yaroslavl province where he was elected to the Rostov Soviet. During 1917 he returned to Moscow, where he played a prominent role in the Bolshevik seizure of power as a member of the regional bureau of the Moscow Soviet. He was also member, and briefly secretary of the Moscow bureau of the Bolshevik party, which became the All-Russian Communist Party (Bolsheviks) or RCP(b).

During the controversy over the Treaty of Brest-Litovsk, Mantsev supported the Left Communists, led by Nikolai Bukharin who opposed the treaty and advocated continuing the war with Germany.

He joined the Cheka September in 1918, where he headed the investigations department. He was also vice-chairman of the Moscow Cheka. In 1920, he was transferred to Kharkiv which was then the capital of Ukraine as Chairman of the Ukraine Cheka.

In 1921, Mantsev received instructions from Lenin to deal with the Popular Socialist economist Alexey Peshekhonov who was working for the People's Commissariat for Agriculture. Mantsev's instructions were to spy on Peshekhonov, to list and spy on his associates, ensure that Peshekhonov resigned from the Ukrainian Central Committee and that he return to Moscow.

From March 1922, Mantsev was People's Commissar of Internal Affairs of Ukraine. From 1923 to 1924 he was a member of the Central Control Commission of the RCP (b). From August 1923, a member of the collegium of the People's Commissariat of the Workers 'and Peasants' Inspection of the USSR. Since October 1923, a member of the board of the GPU (OGPU). From 1924 to 1936 he was the head of the Economic Planning Department of the Supreme Economic Council, the Deputy People's Commissar of Finance of the USSR. In 1936–37, he was deputy chairman of the Supreme Court of the RSFSR.

== Arrest and death ==
Mantsev was arrested during the Great Purge on 22 October 1937. On 7 March 1938 he was called as a witness at the third and largest of the Moscow trials, and made to testify that in 1918 Bukharin and the Left Communists had plotted to overthrow the soviet government and kill Lenin, Stalin and Yakov Sverdlov - an accusation that the communist authorities acknowledged to have been false, after Stalin's death.

Mantsev was sentenced to death on 28 July, and executed on 19 August 1938. He was rehabilitated in 1956.
