= Krivets, Cherepovetsky District, Vologda Oblast =

Krivets Кривец
- Settlement
- Location within Vologda Oblast Location within Russia
- Coordinates: 59°10′N 37°25′E
- Country: Russia
- Region: Vologda Oblast
- District: Cherepovetsky District
- Time zone: UTC+3:00

Krivets (Russian: Кривец) is a rural locality (a settlement) in Sudskoye Rural Settlement, Cherepovetsky District, Vologda Oblast, Russia. The population was 396 as of 2002. There are five streets.

== Geography ==
Krivets is located 39 km (24 mi) northwest of Cherepovets (the district's administrative centre) by road. Vladimirovka is the nearest rural locality.
