= All-Ukrainian Extraordinary Commission =

Ukrainian Branch of the Cheka

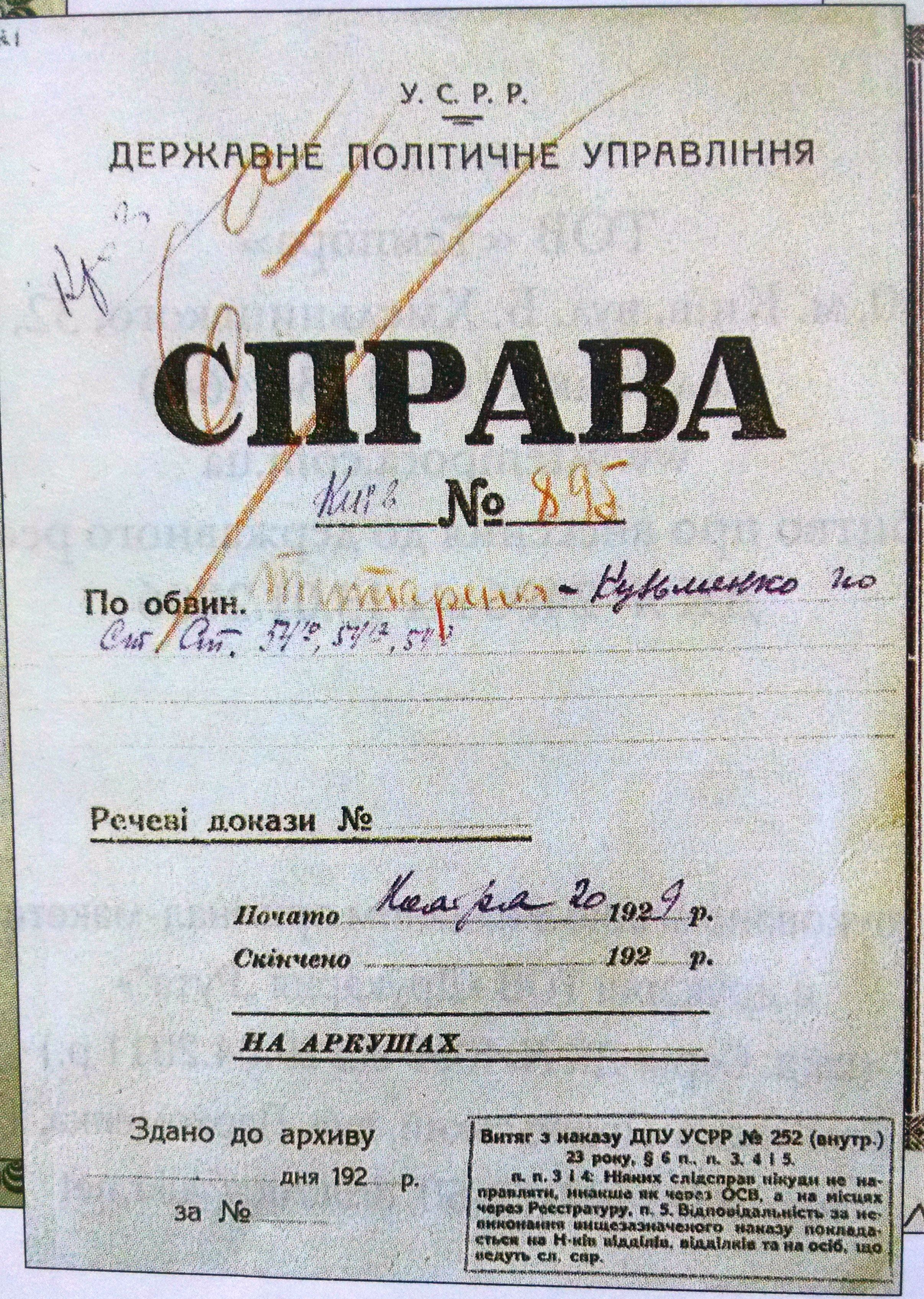
Case of Kuzmenko-Tatrenko by the State Political Directorate of the Ukrainian SSR

All-Ukrainian Extraordinary Commission (Ukrainian: Всеукраїнська надзвичайна комісія, ВУНК, romanized: Vseukrainska nadzvychaina komisiia, VUNK; Russian: Всеукраинская чрезвычайная комиссия, ВУЧК) was a Soviet secret police and an affiliation of the Russian Cheka. It was also known as VUChK to distinguish it from its Russian version - VChK. As its parent organization, VUChK was a Bolshevik penal agency that was effectively used to establish "Dictatorship of the proletariat" and was closely associated with the Red Terror.

The commission was created on December 3, 1918, in Kursk and was subordinated to the Provisional Workers-Peasants Government of Ukraine. To accomplish its task under VUChK and local extraordinary commissions were created military formations. Until 1920 it was controlled by the Narkom of Justice and the Supreme Socialist Inspection, after 1920 by the Narkom of Workers Peasants Inspection (Rabkrin).

On March 22, 1922, the commission was reformed into the State Political Administration (DPU) by a resolution of the All-Ukrainian Central Executive Committee.

== Chairmen ==
- December 1918 – March 1919 Isaak Shvarts (appointed from Moscow)
- April 2 1919 – September 16 1919 Martin Latsis
- 1919 – March 1922 Vasiliy Mantsev
