= Krivtsy =

Krivtsy Кривцы
- Village
- Location within Perm Krai Location within Russia
- Coordinates: 60°12′N 55°02′E
- Country: Russia
- Region: Perm Krai
- District: Kosinsky District
- Time zone: UTC+5:00

Krivtsy (Russian: Кривцы) is a rural locality (a village) in Svetlichanskoye Rural Settlement, Kosinsky District, Perm Krai, Russia. The population was 15 as of 2010. There are 2 streets.

== Geography ==
Krivtsy is located 46 km north of Kosa (the district's administrative centre) by road. Solym is the nearest rural locality.
