= Bobrovytsia =

Urban locality in Chernihiv Oblast, Ukraine

Bobrovytsia Бобровиця
- City
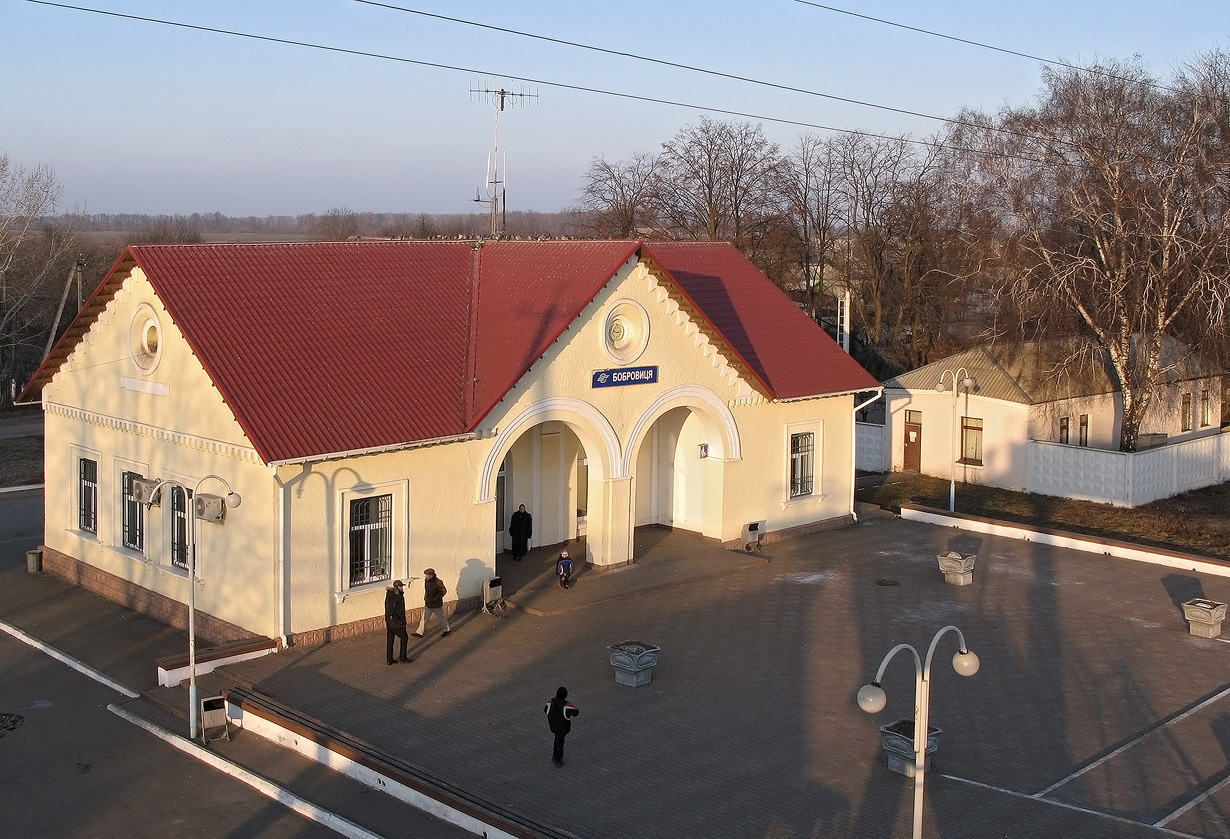
- Bobrovytsia railway station

- Coat of arms

- Location within Chernihiv Oblast Location within Ukraine
- Coordinates: 50°44′42″N 31°23′13″E
- Country: Ukraine
- Oblast: Chernihiv Oblast
- Raion: Nizhyn Raion
- Hromada: Bobrovytsia urban hromada
- Founded: 11th century

Area
  - Total: 11.43 km^{2} (4.41 sq mi)

Population (2022)
  - Total: 10,541
  - Estimate (2025): 10,507

Bobrovytsia (Ukrainian: Бобровиця, pronounced [boˈbrɔwɪtsʲɐ]), is a city in Nizhyn Raion within Chernihiv Oblast (province) of Ukraine. It sits next to the Bystrytsia. Bobrovytsia hosts the administration of Bobrovytsia urban hromada, one of the hromadas of Ukraine. Population: 10,541 (2022 estimate).

== History ==
The ancient origins of Bobrovytsia are known from the archaeological ruins of a settlement dated from the 11th-13th centuries.

In the 16th century, Bobrovytsia was a town in the Kyiv province of the Polish-Lithuanian Commonwealth. In 1614, it was a royal city of Poland and later became a part of the Kiev Voivodeship. According to Polish illustrations "Bobrowica" in 1618 had about 107 homes. According to another Polish illustration in 1628, the town was inhabited as early as the year 1600. In 1667 it passed to Russia.

Until 18 July 2020, Bobrovytsia was the administrative center of Bobrovytsia Raion. The raion was abolished in July 2020 as part of the administrative reform of Ukraine, which reduced the number of raions of Chernihiv Oblast to five. The area of Bobrovytsia Raion was merged into Nizhyn Raion.

=== Name origins ===
On the origin of the name of the city Bobrovytsia, there is no reliable data. There are only guesses that the settlement was called such from the beaver crafts made in the city, near the Bystritsia River to the middle of the 19th century which was called Bobrovytsia.

== Demographics ==
=== Population ===
Population: - Ukrainian (92%, 2001)

- 2.9 thousand. (1859)
- 5.1 thousand. (1897) Orthodox - 4.4 thousand., Jews - 0,7 thousand.
- 7.0 thousand. (1926)
- 9.4 thousand. (1959)
- 14.5 thousand. (1988)
- 11.9 thousand. (2005)
- 11.3 thousand. (2016)

=== Native language distribution (2001) ===
Ukrainian	Russian
97,22%	2,31%

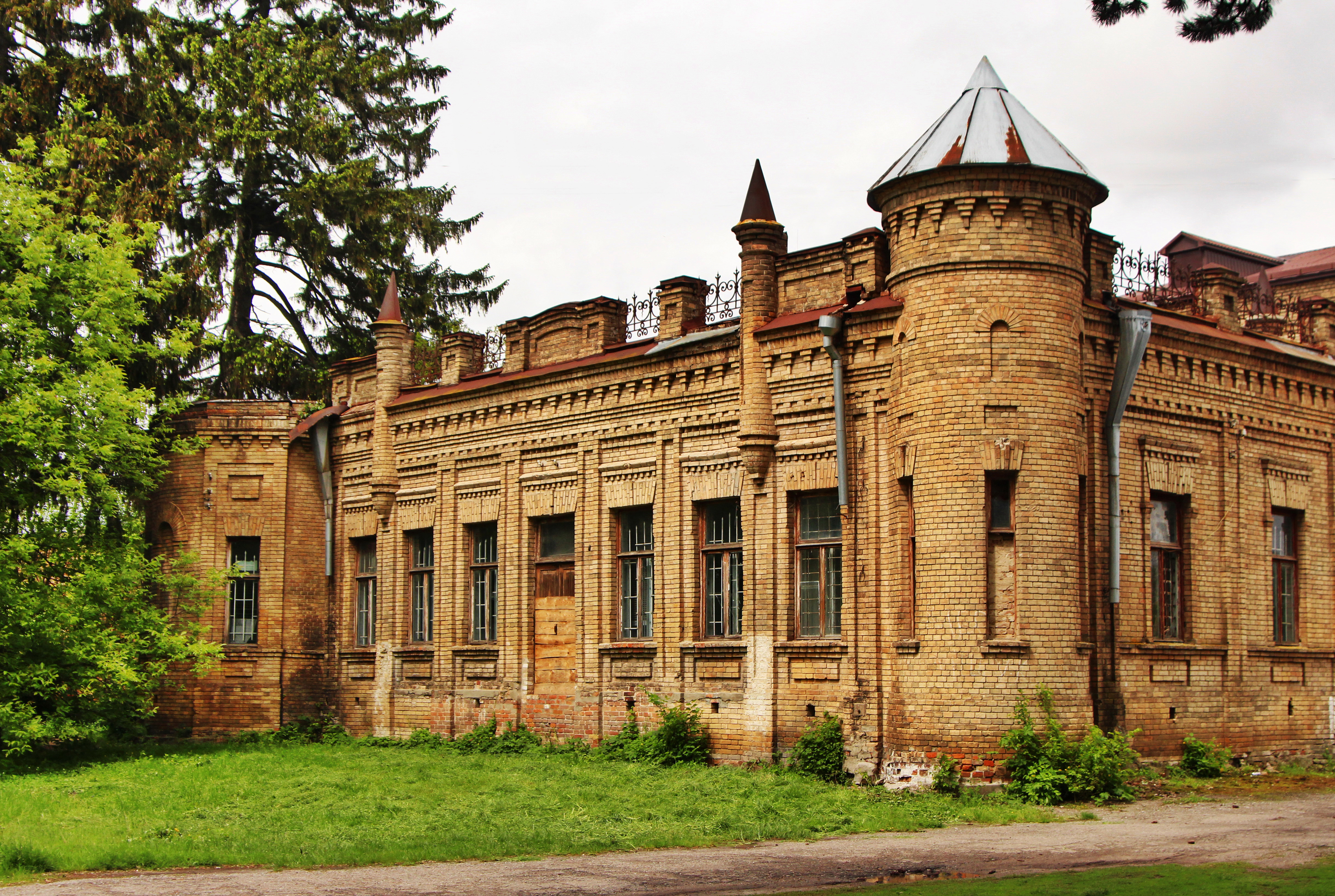
Katerynych palace in Bobrovytsia

== Economy and education ==
Bobrovytsia is a historical centre of sugar industry. A zootechnical school operated in the nearby village of Maynivka.

== Points of interest ==
The local library is located in the former palace built by local landowner and philanthropist Petro Katerynych. In 2025 the palace was included in the regional list of cultural heritage monuments and is currently undergoing restoration.

On the outskirts of Bobrovytsia there is a mausoleum built by Ukrainian agribusinessman and politician Leonid Yakovyshyn for his own burial.
