= Bobrovytsia Raion =

Former subdivision of Chernihiv Oblast, Ukraine

Bobrovytsia Raion Бобровицький район
- Raion
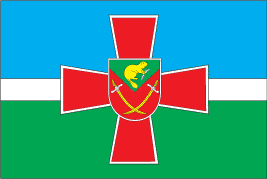
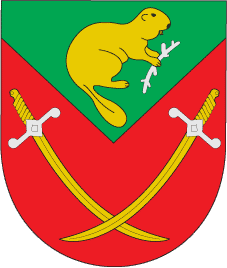
- Flag Coat of arms

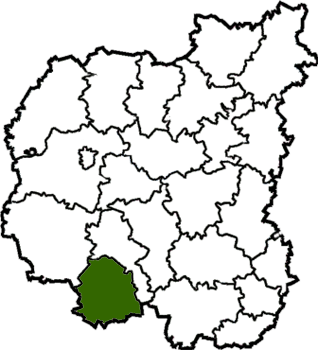
- Raion location in Chernihiv Oblast
- Coordinates: 50°41′54″N 31°28′17″E
- Country: Ukraine
- Oblast: Chernihiv Oblast
- Disestablished: 18 July 2020
- Admin. center: Bobrovytsia

Area
  - Total: 1,418 km^{2} (547 sq mi)

Population (2020)
  - Total: 31,435
  - Density: 22.17/km^{2} (57.42/sq mi)
- Time zone: UTC+2 (EET)
  - Summer (DST): UTC+3 (EEST)
- Website: bobradm.cg.gov.ua

Bobrovytsia Raion (Ukrainian: Бобровицький район) was a raion (district) of Chernihiv Oblast, northern Ukraine. Its administrative centre was located at the city of Bobrovytsia. The raion was abolished on 18 July 2020 as part of the administrative reform of Ukraine, which reduced the number of raions of Chernihiv Oblast to five. The area of Bobrovytsia Raion was merged into Nizhyn Raion. The last estimate of the raion population was 31,435 (2020 est.)

At the time of disestablishment, the raion consisted of two hromadas:

- Bobrovytsia urban hromada with the administration in Bobrovytsia;
- Nova Basan rural hromada with the administration in the selo of Nova Basan.
