= Bobrovytsia urban hromada =

Bobrovytsia urban hromada Бобровицька міська громада
- Hromada
- Interactive map of Bobrovytsia urban hromada
- Country: Ukraine
- Oblast: Chernihiv
- Raion: Nizhyn

Area
  - Total: 1,055.5 km^{2} (407.5 sq mi)

Population (2020)
  - Total: 24,750
  - Density: 23.45/km^{2} (60.73/sq mi)
- CATOTTG code: UA74040050000013413
- Settlements: 41
- Cities: 1
- Rural settlements: 1
- Villages: 39
- Website: bobrovycka-gromada.gov.ua

Bobrovytsia urban hromada (Ukrainian: Бобровицька міська громада) is a hromada of Ukraine, located in Nizhyn Raion, Chernihiv Oblast. Its administrative center is the city of Bobrovytsia.

It has an area of 1,055.5 square kilometres (407.5 mi^{2}) and a population of 24,750, as of 2020.

== Composition ==
The hromada contains 41 settlements: 1 city (Bobrovytsia), 39 villages:

- Branytsia
- Bryhyntsi
- Buhlaky
- Vyshneve
- Havrylivka
- Hart
- Horbachi
- Zaporizhzhia
- Zatyshsha
- Zelene
- Katerynivka
- Kobyzhcha
- Kozatske
- Konoshivka
- Lidyn
- Mainivka
- Makarivka
- Markivtsi
- Mykolaiv
- Molodizhne
- Naumivka
- Ozeryany
- Oleksandrivka
- Osovets
- Osokorivka
- Petrivka
- Pisky
- Vylka
- Rudkivka
- Svidovets
- Stara Basan
- Sukhinya
- Tatarivka
- Travkyne
- Ukrainka
- Urozhane
- Homivtsi
- Shchasnivka
- Yaroslavka

And 1 rural-type settlement: Myrne.

== See also ==
- List of hromadas of Ukraine
