= Nova Basan =

Village in Nizhyn Raion, Chernihiv Oblast, Ukraine

Coordinates: 50°34′15″N 31°30′56″E

Nova Basan (Ukrainian: Нова Басань) is a village (selo) of Ukraine, in Nizhyn Raion, Chernihiv Oblast. It hosts the administration of Nova Basan rural hromada, one of the hromadas of Ukraine.

== History ==
The history of Nova Basan dates back at least as far as the middle of the 15th century, when it was a border fortress of the Grand Duchy of Lithuania. In 1897, a post office was opened in Nova Basan. According to the Russian Empire Census of 1897, it had a population 7326, of whom 3460 were men and 3866 women. 6930 were Orthodox.

During the 2022 Russian Invasion of Ukraine, the village was occupied by Russia after the initial invasion but was retaken by Ukraine in early April.

== Demographics ==
According to the 1989 USSR Census, the village had a population of 4017, of whom 1700 were men and 2317 women.

According to the 2001 Ukrainian census, the village had a population of 3282.

=== Languages ===
The native languages of its inhabitants, according to the 2001 census:

| Language | % |
|---|---|
| Ukrainian | 98.53 % |
| Russian | 1.31 % |
| Romanian | 0.09 % |
| Belarusian | 0.03 % |

== Notable people ==
- Yurii Hlushko-Mova (1882 —1942), Ukrainian public and political figure.
- Lev Biryuk, Ukrainian politician.
- Vasyl Lopata, Ukrainian artist and author.
