= Nova Basan rural hromada =

Nova Basan rural hromada Новобасанська сільська громада
- Hromada
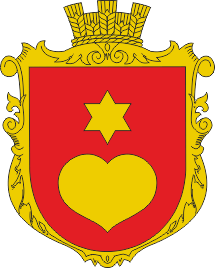
- Coat of arms
- Interactive map of Nova Basan rural hromada
- Country: Ukraine
- Oblast: Chernihiv
- Raion: Nizhyn

Area
  - Total: 362.2 km^{2} (139.8 sq mi)

Population (2020)
  - Total: 6,132
  - Density: 16.93/km^{2} (43.85/sq mi)
- CATOTTG code: UA74040270000069132
- Settlements: 13
- Rural settlements: 1
- Villages: 12
- Website: novobasanska.gromada.org.ua

Nova Basan rural hromada (Ukrainian: Новобасанська сільська громада) is a hromada of Ukraine, located in Nizhyn Raion, Chernihiv Oblast. Its administrative center is the village of Nova Basan.

It has an area of 362.2 square kilometres (139.8 mi^{2}) and a population of 6,132, as of 2020.

== Composition ==
The hromada contains 13 settlements, with 12 villages:

- Bilotserkivtsi
- Birky
- Vepryk
- Voronki
- Krasne
- Mochalishche
- Nova Basan
- Novy Bykiv
- Novoselitsa
- Rokytne
- Sokolyvka
- Stary Bykiv

And 1 rural-type settlement: Chistopilla.

== See also ==
- List of hromadas of Ukraine
