= Chernihiv Oblast =

Oblast (region) of Ukraine

Chernihiv Oblast Чернігівська область
- Oblast
- Chernihivska oblast
- Flag Coat of arms
- Nickname: Чернігівщина (Chernihivshchyna)
- Coordinates: 51.34°N 32.06°E
- Country: Ukraine
- Established: 15 October 1932
- Administrative center: Chernihiv
- Largest cities: Chernihiv, Nizhyn, Pryluky

Government
  - Governor: Vyacheslav Chaus
  - Oblast council: 64 seats
  - Chairperson: Olena Dmytrenko

Area
  - Total: 31,865 km^{2} (12,303 sq mi)
  - Rank: Ranked 3rd

Population (2022)
  - Total: 959,315 ▼
  - Density: 30.106/km^{2} (77.973/sq mi)

GDP
  - Total: ₴ 114 billion (€2.9 billion)
  - Per capita: ₴ 117,225 (€3,000)
- Time zone: UTC+2 (EET)
  - Summer (DST): UTC+3 (EEST)
- Postal code: 14-17xxx
- Area code: +380 46
- ISO 3166 code: UA-74
- Vehicle registration: СВ
- Raions: 5
- Hromadas: 57
- HDI (2022): 0.737 high
- FIPS 10-4: UP02
- NUTS statistical regions of Ukraine: UA14
- Website: chor.gov.ua

Chernihiv Oblast (Ukrainian: Чернігівська область, romanized: Chernihivska oblast), also referred to as Chernihivshchyna (Ukrainian: Чернігівщина), is an oblast (province) in northern Ukraine. The administrative center of the oblast is the city of Chernihiv. There are 1,511 settlements in the oblast, with a total population of 959,315 (2022 estimate).

== Geography ==
The total area of the province is around 31,900 km².

On the west, the oblast is bordered by the Kyiv Reservoir of the Dnieper River and Kyiv Oblast, which has an enclave known as Slavutych, which was created from Chernihiv Oblast for the inhabitants of Chernobyl following the Chernobyl disaster. It is bordered by Sumy Oblast to the east and Poltava Oblast to the south. The northern border of the oblast is part of Ukraine's international border abutting Belarus's Gomel Region in the north-west and the Russian Bryansk Oblast in the north-east, respectively.

The oblast is bisected into northern and southern sections by the Desna River, which enters the Dnieper just north of the Kyiv city limits. It is located in the historic regions of Left-bank Ukraine and Polissia.

== History ==
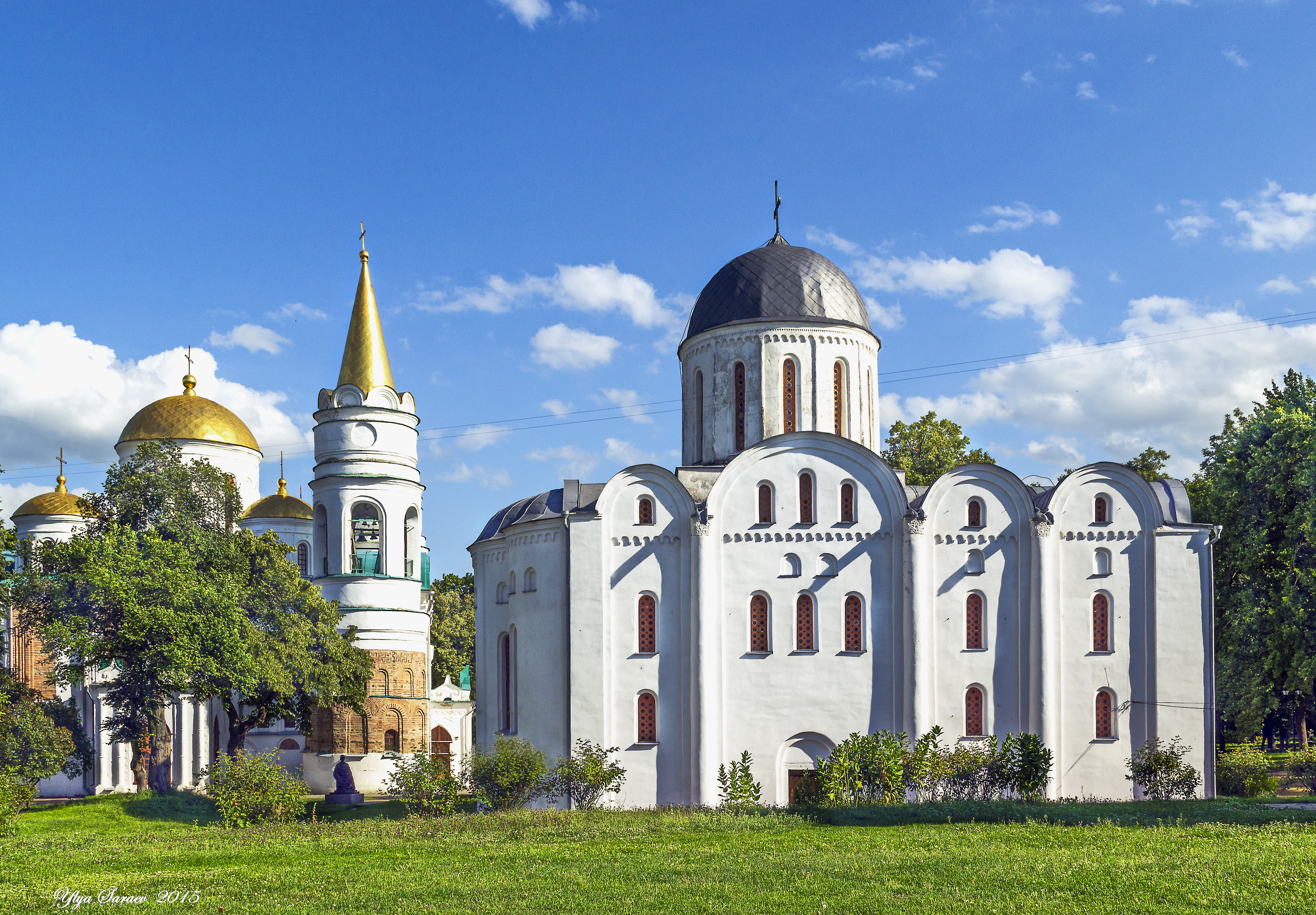
Medieval Transfiguration Cathedral and Boris and Gleb Cathedral in Chernihiv

Chernihiv Oblast was created as part of the Ukrainian Soviet Socialist Republic on 15 October 1932.

The capital city of Chernihiv has known human settlement for over 2,000 years, according to archaeological excavations. Chernihiv Oblast comprises a very important historical region, notable as early as the Kievan Rus' period, when the cities of Chernihiv and Novhorod-Siverskyi were frequently mentioned. The city of Chernihiv was the second most important Ukrainian city during the Rus' period of Ukrainian history, often serving as a major regional capital. Danylo of Chernihiv wrote of his pilgrimage to Jerusalem during this era. The region at various times was ruled by the Kievan Rus', Mongol Empire, Lithuania, Poland and Russia. Numerous tragic events have taken place in the region, such as the Battle of Kruty and the Koriukivka massacre. During World War II, the province was occupied by Germany in 1941–1943.

During the 2022 invasion of Ukraine, the oblast was one of the first regions where Russian and Ukrainian forces clashed. On 4 April 2022, Governor of Chernihiv Oblast Vyacheslav Chaus said that the Russian military had left, leaving mines planted in many areas. On 4–5 April 2022, units of the State Border Guard Service of Ukraine retook control of their border crossing. Since the Russians left, the Russian Federation has been constantly shelling the border areas of the oblast. Chernihiv Oblast is one of the oblasts that suffer the most from unmanned aerial vehicles and other means of air attack . , .

== Demographics ==
The current estimated population of the oblast is around 976,701 (as of 2021).

According to the 2001 Ukrainian census, ethnic Ukrainians accounted for 93.5% of the population of Chernihiv Oblast, and ethnic Russians for 5.0%.

=== Language ===
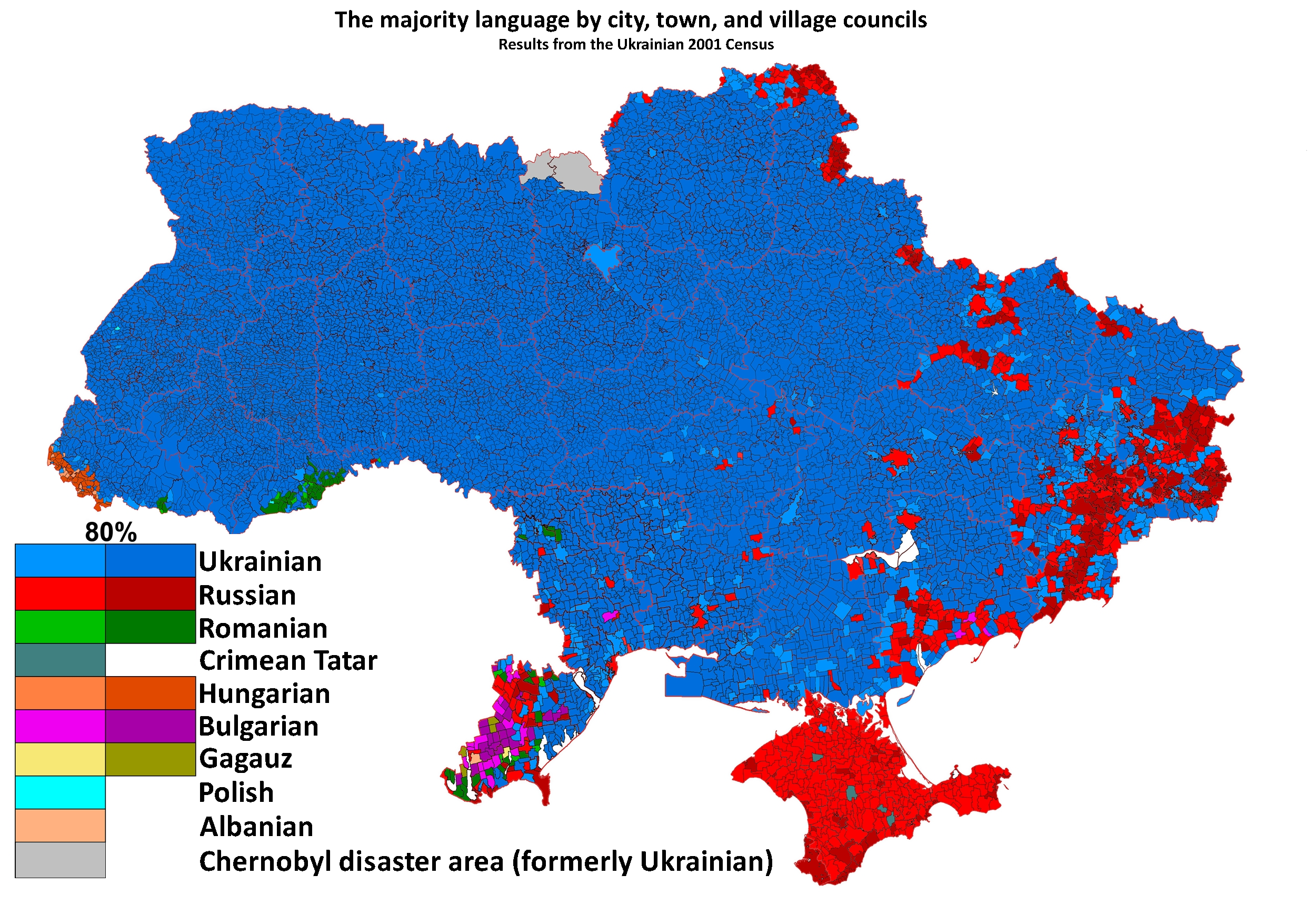
According to the 2001 Ukrainian census, Ukrainian was the native language for over 89% of Chernihiv Oblast's population: it was the dominant language in all of the city and town councils, as well as in the absolute majority of the village councils of the oblast. In the extreme north of Chernihiv Oblast, near the border with Russia and Belarus, Russian was the dominant language in twelve village councils, all of which also had significant (over 20%) Ukrainian-speaking minorities.

Due to the Russification of Ukraine during the Soviet era, the share of Ukrainian speakers in the population of Chernihiv Oblast gradually decreased between the 1970 and 1989 censuses, while the share of Russian speakers increased. Native language of the population of Chernihiv Oblast according to the results of population censuses:

	1959	1970	1989	2001
Ukrainian	88.1%	88.8%	85.7%	89.1%
Russian	11.1%	10.6%	13.6%	10.3%
Other	0.8%	0.6%	0.7%	0.4%

Native language of the population of the raions and cities of Chernihiv Oblast according to the 2001 Ukrainian census:

	Ukrainian	Russian
Chernihiv Oblast	89.1%	10.3%
City of Chernihiv	74.0%	24.5%
City of Nizhyn	89.5%	8.9%
City of Pryluky	92.9%	6.8%
Bakhmach Raion	97.1%	2.5%
Bobrovytsia Raion	97.9%	1.8%
Borzna Raion	98.4%	1.4%
Varva Raion	97.0%	2.7%
Horodnia Raion	92.5%	7.0%
Ichnia Raion	97.8%	2.0%
Kozelets Raion	95.8%	3.8%
Korop Raion	97.8%	2.0%
Koriukivka Raion (in pre-2020 borders)	96.9%	2.8%
Kulykivka Raion	98.0%	1.7%
Mena Raion	97.5%	2.1%
Nizhyn Raion (in pre-2020 borders)	98.5%	1.3%
Novhorod-Siverskyi Raion (in pre-2020 borders)	63.9%	35.9%
Nosivka Raion	97.9%	1.7%
Pryluky Raion (in pre-2020 borders)	97.2%	2.4%
Ripky Raion	87.6%	11.4%
Semenivka Raion	80.4%	19.4%
Snovsk Raion	89.4%	10.3%
Sosnytsia Raion	98.4%	1.4%
Sribne Raion	98.3%	1.5%
Talalaivka Raion	98.0%	1.9%
Chernihiv Raion (in pre-2020 borders)	95.4%	4.0%

Ukrainian is the only official language on the whole territory of Chernihiv Oblast.

According to a poll conducted by Rating from 16 November to 10 December 2018 as part of the project «Portraits of Regions», 80% of the residents of Chernihiv Oblast believed that the Ukrainian language should be the only state language on the entire territory of Ukraine. 12% believed that Ukrainian should be the only state language, while Russian should be the second official language in some regions of the country. 3% believed that Russian should become the second state language of the country. 5% found it difficult to answer.

On 21 March 2023, Chernihiv Oblast Military Administration approved the «Programme to promote the functioning of the Ukrainian language as a state language in Chernihiv Oblast for 2023—2028», the main objective of which is to strengthen the positions of the Ukrainian language in various spheres of public life in the oblast.

According to the research of the Content Analysis Centre, conducted from 15 August to 15 September 2024, the topic of which was the ratio of Ukrainian and Russian languages in the Ukrainian segment of social media, 76.2% of posts from Chernihiv Oblast were written in Ukrainian (67.8% in 2023, 56.6% in 2022, 18.1% in 2020), while 23.8% were written in Russian (32.2% in 2023, 43.4% in 2022, 81.9% in 2020).

After Ukraine declared independence in 1991, Chernihiv Oblast, as well as Ukraine as a whole, experienced a gradual Ukrainization of the education system, which had been Russified during the Soviet era. Dynamics of the ratio of the languages of instruction in general secondary education institutions in Chernihiv Oblast:

Language of instruction, % of pupils	1991— 1992	1992— 1993	1993— 1994	1994— 1995	1995— 1996	2000— 2001	2005— 2006	2007— 2008	2010— 2011	2012— 2013	2015— 2016	2018— 2019	2021— 2022	2022— 2023
Ukrainian	67.1%	70.3%	74.0%	78.0%	81.0%	94.0%	99.0%	99.0%	99.5%	99.6%	99.6%	99.6%	99.97%	100.0%
Russian	32.9%	29.7%	26.0%	22.0%	19.0%	6.0%	1.0%	1.0%	0.5%	0.4%	0.4%	0.4%	0.03%	—

According to the State Statistics Service of Ukraine, in the 2023—2024 school year, all 89,872 pupils in general secondary education institutions in Chernihiv Oblast were studying in classes where Ukrainian was the language of instruction.

The province has experienced long-term population decline. The population has fallen 37% from the 1959 figure of 1,554,000, the steepest decline of any Ukrainian oblast. It has the lowest population density in the country.

=== Age structure ===
0-14 years: 12.9% ▲ (male 70,680/female 67,487)
15-64 years: 68.4% ▼ (male 352,230/female 378,864)
65 years and over: 18.7% ▼ (male 61,722/female 138,277) (2013 official)

=== Median age ===
total: 42.8 years
male: 38.5 years ▲
female: 46.9 years (2013 official)

== Administrative subdivisions ==
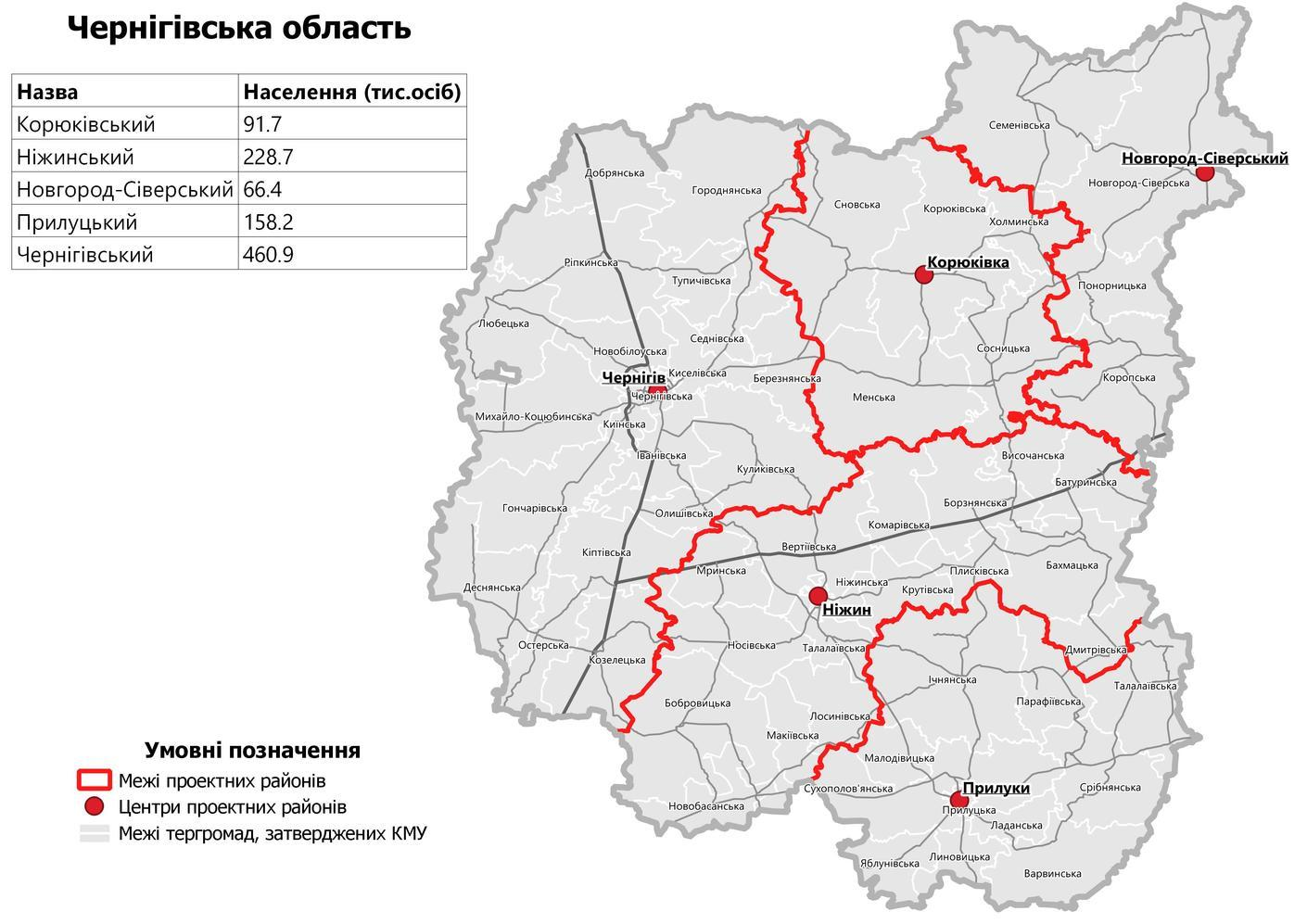
Map of Chernihiv Oblast.

Since July 2020, Chernihiv Oblast is administratively subdivided into 5 raions (districts).

The following data incorporates the number of each type of administrative divisions of Chernihiv Oblast:

- Administrative centre — 1 (Chernihiv),
- Raions — 5,
- Hromadas — 57, including:
  - Urban hromadas — 16,
  - Settlement hromadas — 24,
  - Rural hromadas — 17.

The local administration of the oblast is controlled by the Chernihiv Oblast Rada. The governor of the oblast is the Chernihiv Oblast Rada speaker, appointed by the President of Ukraine.

=== Important settlements ===
Largest cities

1. Chernihiv (294,727)
2. Nizhyn (72,422)
3. Pryluky (58,456)
4. Bakhmach (18,798)
5. Nosivka (14,185)
6. Novhorod-Siverskyi (14,025)

Other settlements

- Borzna (historical city)
- Kozelets (historical town)
- Liubech (historical city of Middle Ages)
- Baturyn (Hetman residence and fort)

=== Raions ===
Flag	Coat of arms	Name	Ukrainian name	Administrative centre	Area (km^{2})	Population estimate (2021)
		Chernihiv Raion	Чернігівський район	Chernihiv	10,249	445,430
		Koriukivka Raion	Корюківський район	Koriukivka	4,578	86,435
		Nizhyn Raion	Ніжинський район	Nizhyn	7,226	215,908
		Novhorod-Siverskyi Raion	Новгород-Сіверський район	Novhorod-Siverskyi	4,630.5	62,141
		Pryluky Raion	Прилуцький район	Pryluky	5,214	149,401
		Chernihiv Oblast	Чернігівська область	Chernihiv	31,865	959,315

The Slavutych municipality is located in Chernihiv Oblast on the eastern bank of the Dnieper, but officially belongs to Kyiv Oblast (being an administrative exclave).

== Economy ==
=== Industry ===
The economy of Chernihiv Oblast is centered around petroleum and natural gas extraction, transport, machinery, tobacco and the textile industry. A major tobacco factory is situated in Pryluky. The cities of Bakhmach and Nizhyn are important railway junctions on the route from Russia and Belarus to Southeast Europe. There are notable machinery and electronics industries in Chernihiv. Chernihiv also has a brewery producing beer under the name "Chernihivske".

== Religion ==
The religion among believers in the oblast is overwhelmingly Eastern Orthodox. A substantial percentage of the population is atheist. Small minorities of Ukrainian Catholics, Roman Catholics (including the descendants of earlier Polish colonists), and recent converts to Protestantism are also present.

== Culture and tourist attractions ==
There are 182 monuments of national significance in Chernihiv Oblast. There are several outstanding historical Orthodox churches and buildings in Chernihiv, Novhorod-Siverskyi, Liubech, Nizhyn, Kozelets, and Pryluky. Nizhyn is a historical Cossack city and home to a university.

- Saint Anthony's Caves
- Churches of Chernihiv, including Saviour-Transfiguration Cathedral, Boris and Gleb Cathedral, Yeletskyi Monastery, Trinity Monastery, St. Catherine's Church, Piatnytska Church
- Hustynia Monastery
- Kniazhyi hrad
- Kachanivka Palace and Sokyryntsi Palace

Chernihiv Oblast was famous for its specific style of folk icon-painting. Brightness and realistic depictions of the saints were typical for it, with red and hot yellow paints used. The icons were decorated by flowers in a manner reminiscent of Slavonic pre-Christian traditions. The icons from Chernihiv Oblast were spread outside its territory. Many of them are preserved in the Museum of Ukrainian home icons of the Radomysl Castle.

== Nomenclature ==
Most of Ukraine's oblasts are named after their capital cities, officially referred to as "oblast centres" (Ukrainian: обласний центр, translit. oblasnyi tsentr). The name of each oblast is a relative adjective, formed by adding a feminine suffix to the name of respective centre city: Chernihiv is the centre of the Chernihivs'ka oblast' (Chernihiv Oblast). Most oblasts are also sometimes referred to in a feminine noun form, following the convention of traditional regional place names, ending with the suffix "-shchyna", as is the case with the Chernihiv Oblast, Chernihivshchyna.

== Honorary citizens ==
People awarded the honorary citizenship of Chernihiv Oblast are, listed by date of award:

Date	Name	Notes
7 October 2021	Andriy Yarmolenko	Ukrainian professional footballer.
7 October 2021	Igor Cheredinov	coach of the Olympic champion in shot of Olena Kostevych.

== Gallery ==
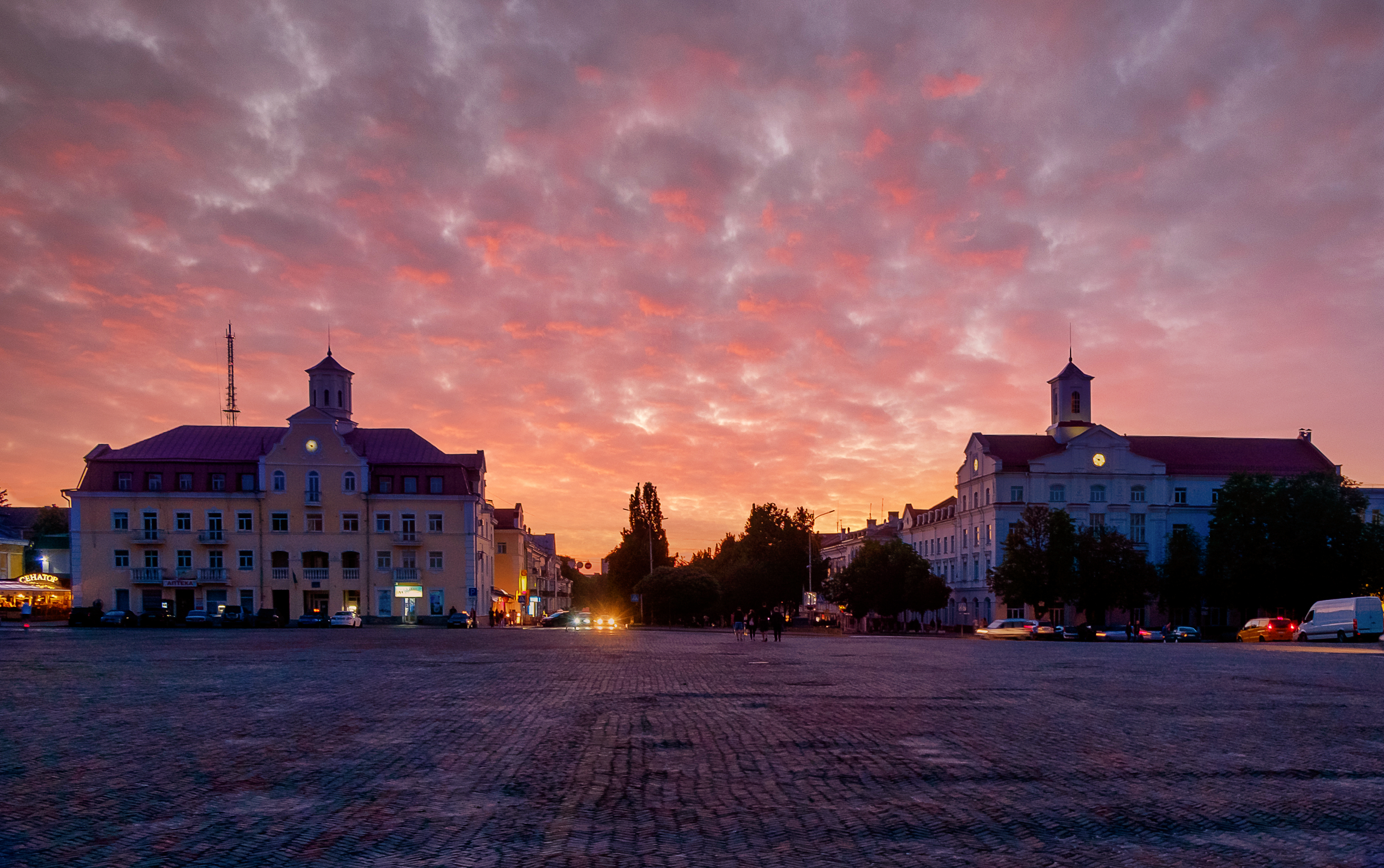
Krasna Square in Chernihiv

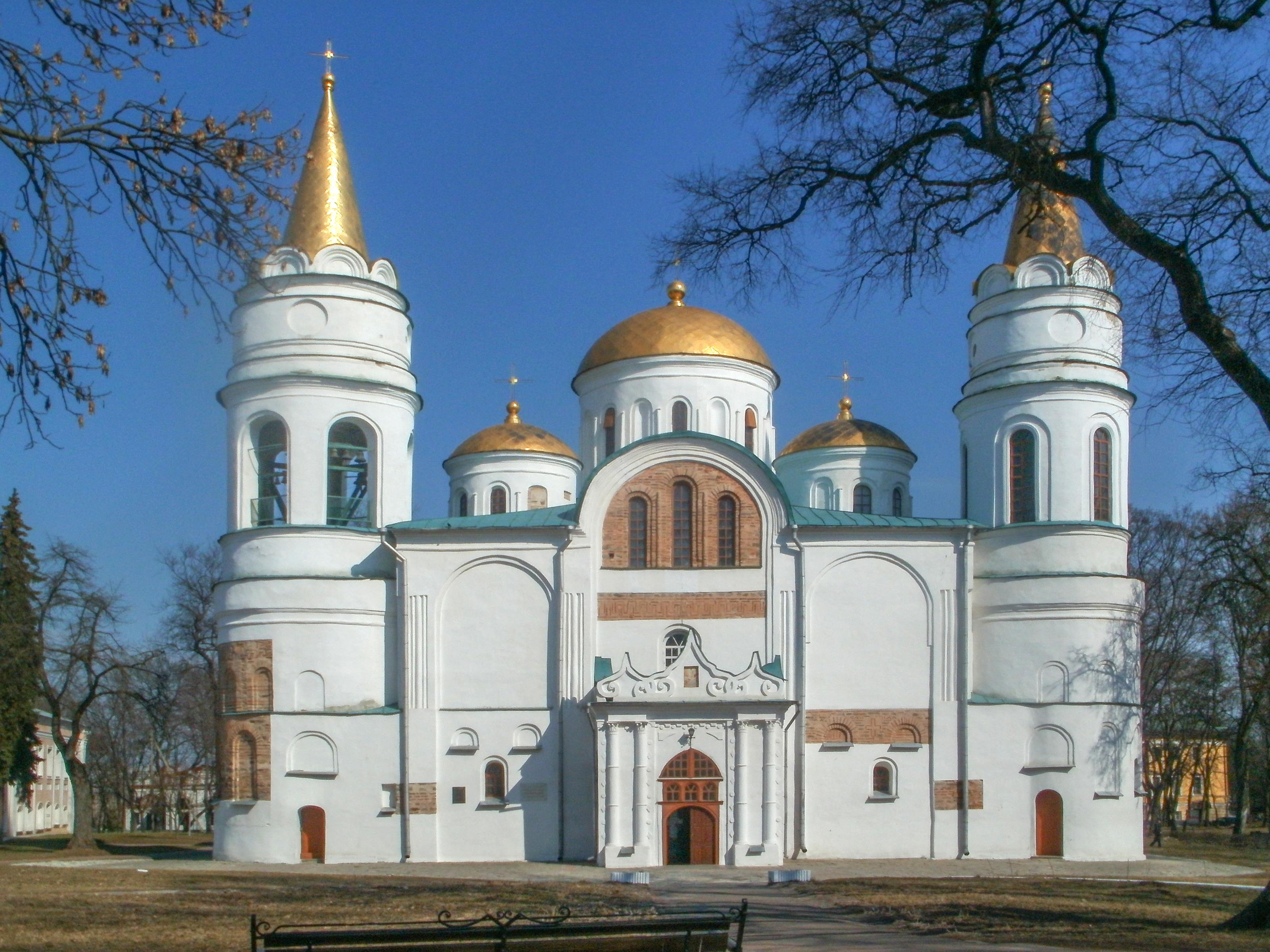
Transfiguration Cathedral in Chernihiv, one of the oldest surviving buildings of pre-Mongol Rus'

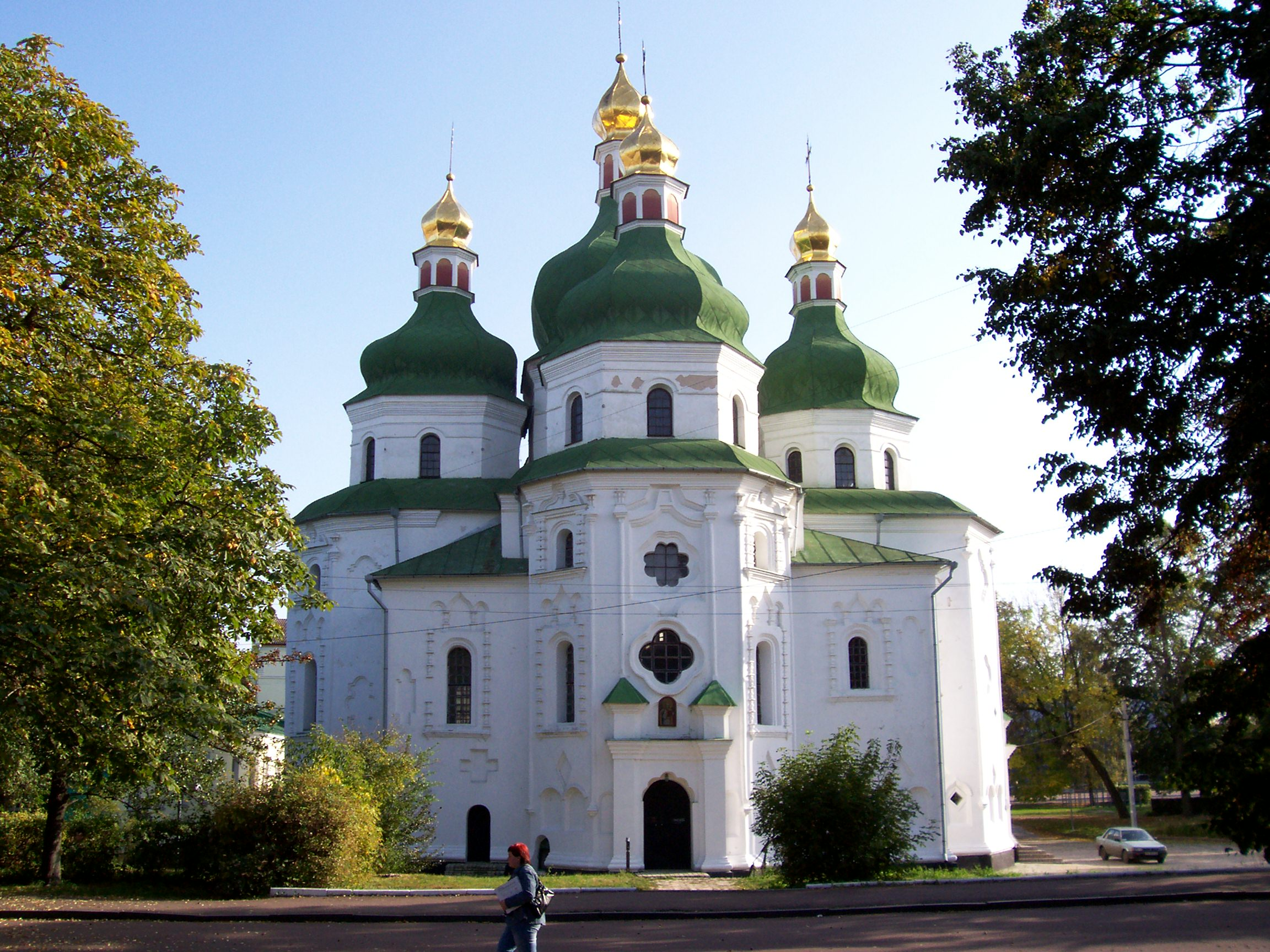
St. Nicholas Cathedral in Nizhyn, the prototype of Ukrainian Baroque

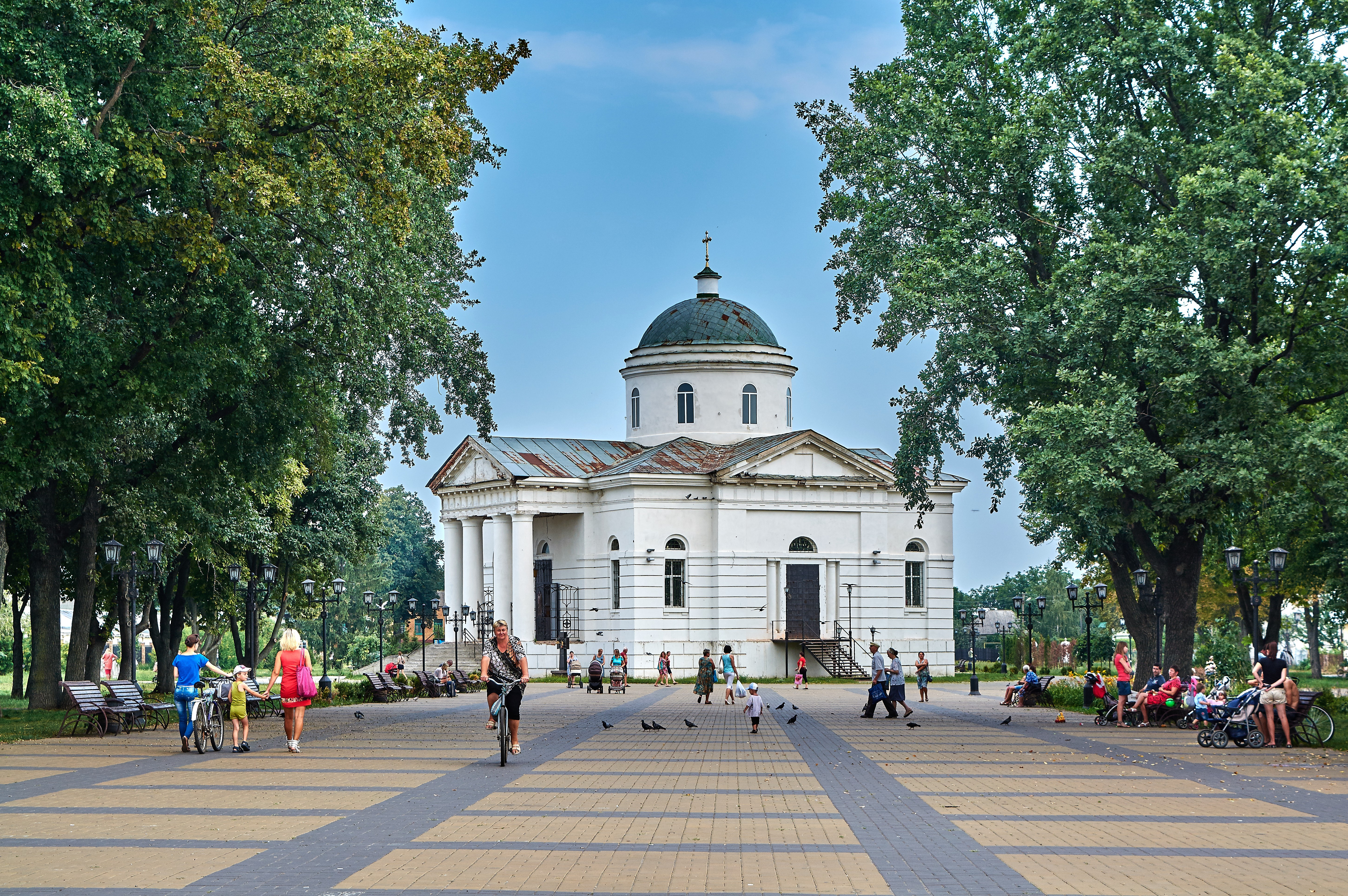
Nativity of the Theotokos Cathedral in Pryluky

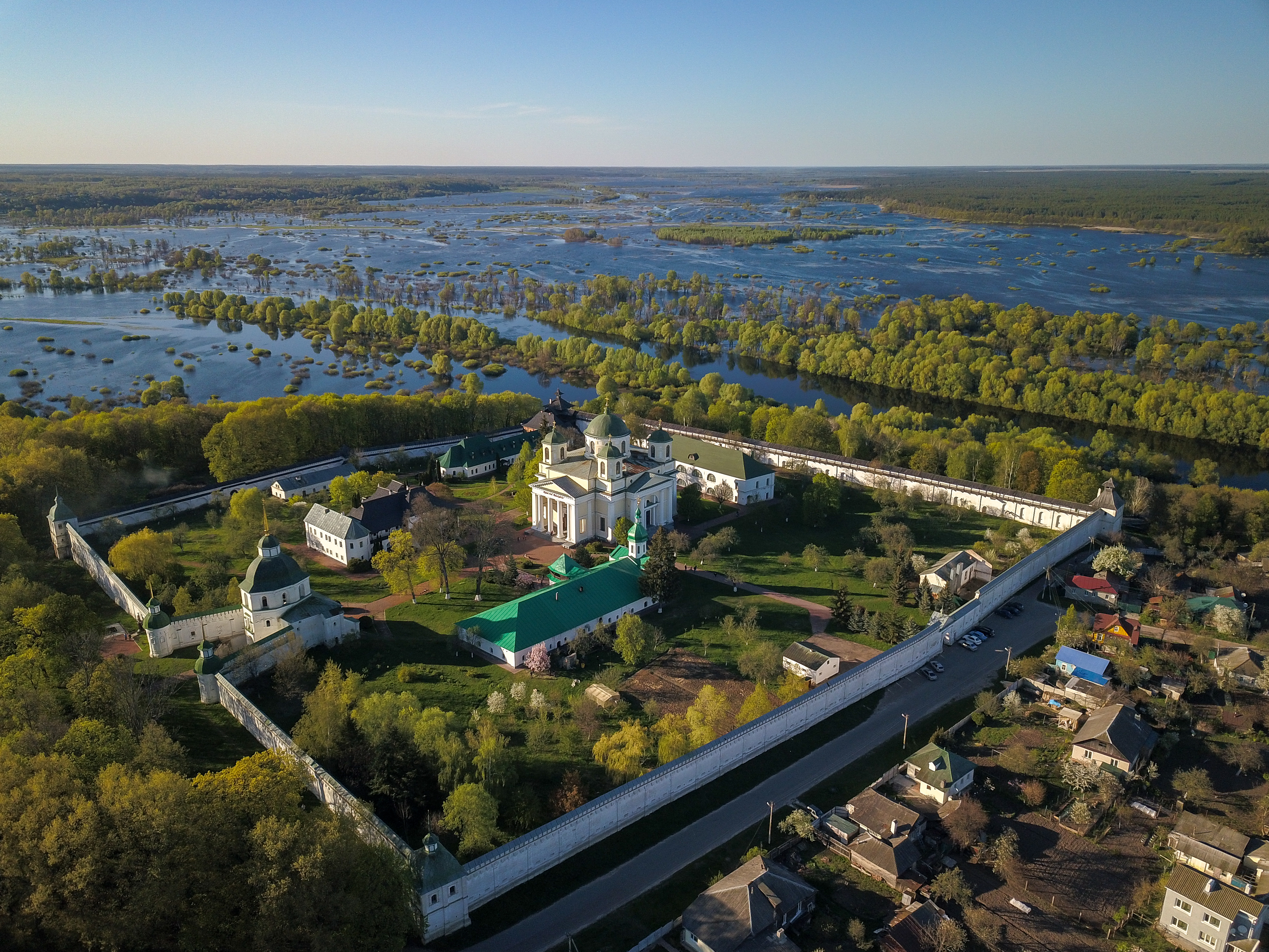
Transfiguration Monastery in Novhorod-Siverskyi

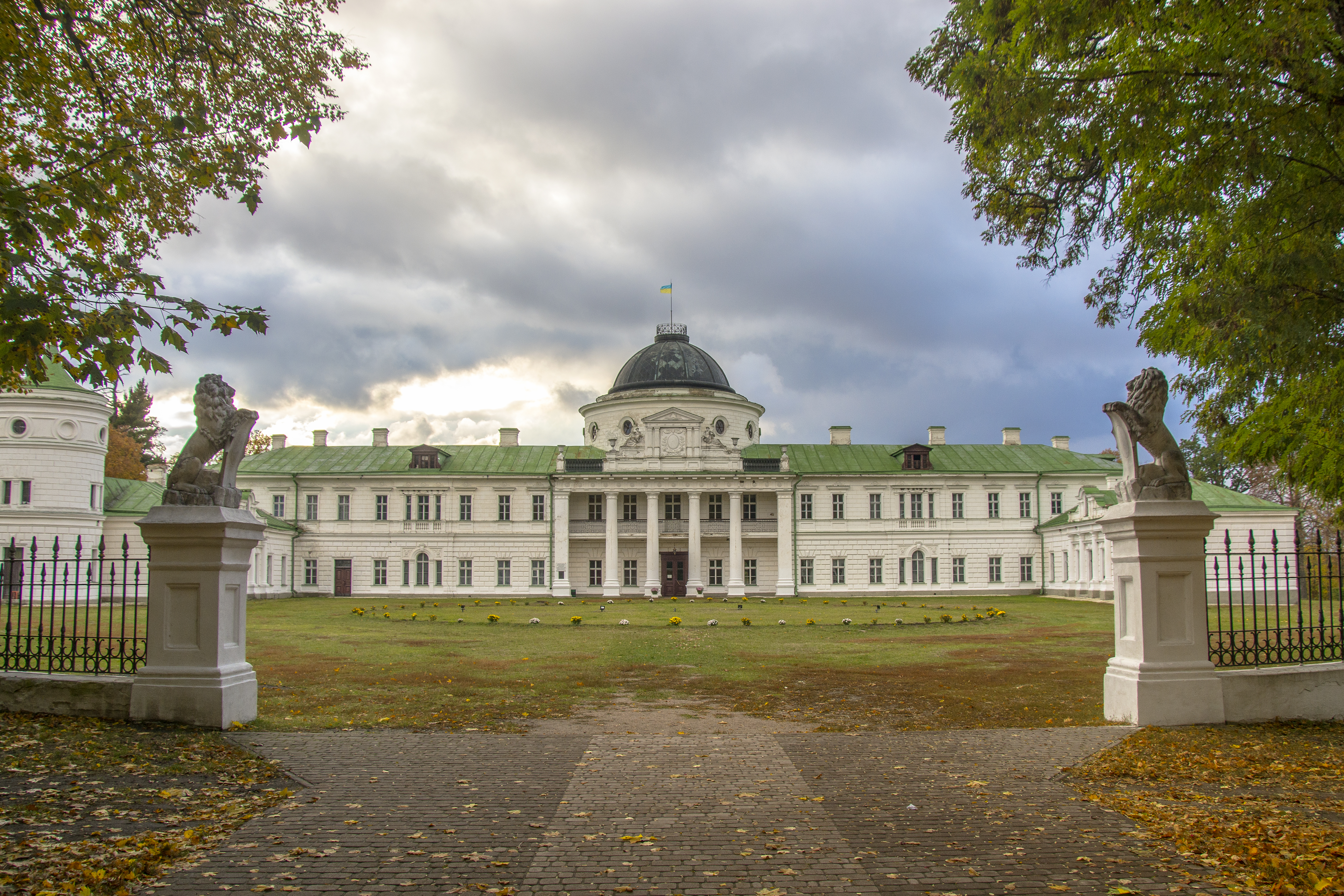
Kachanivka Palace

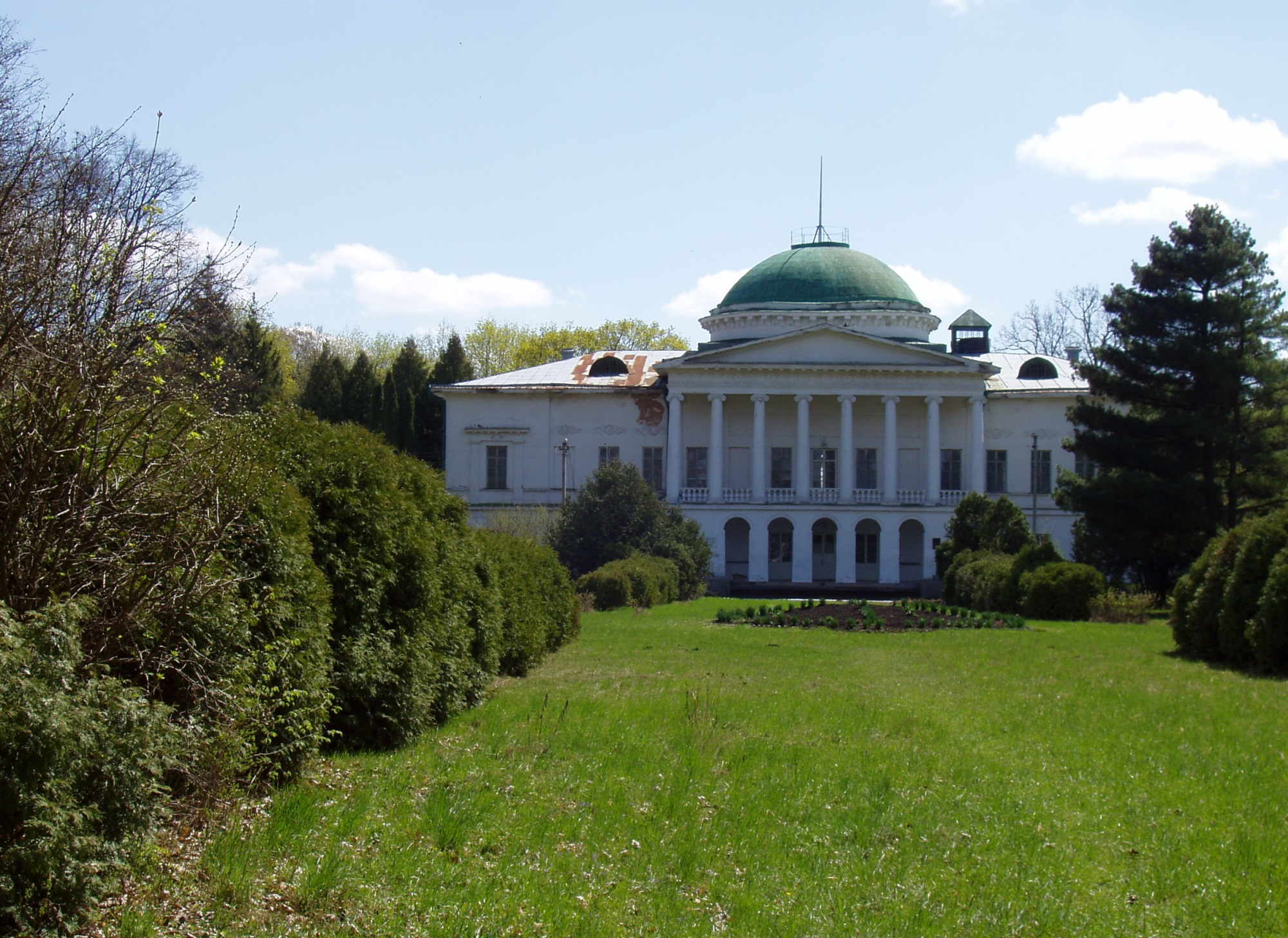
Sokyryntsi Palace

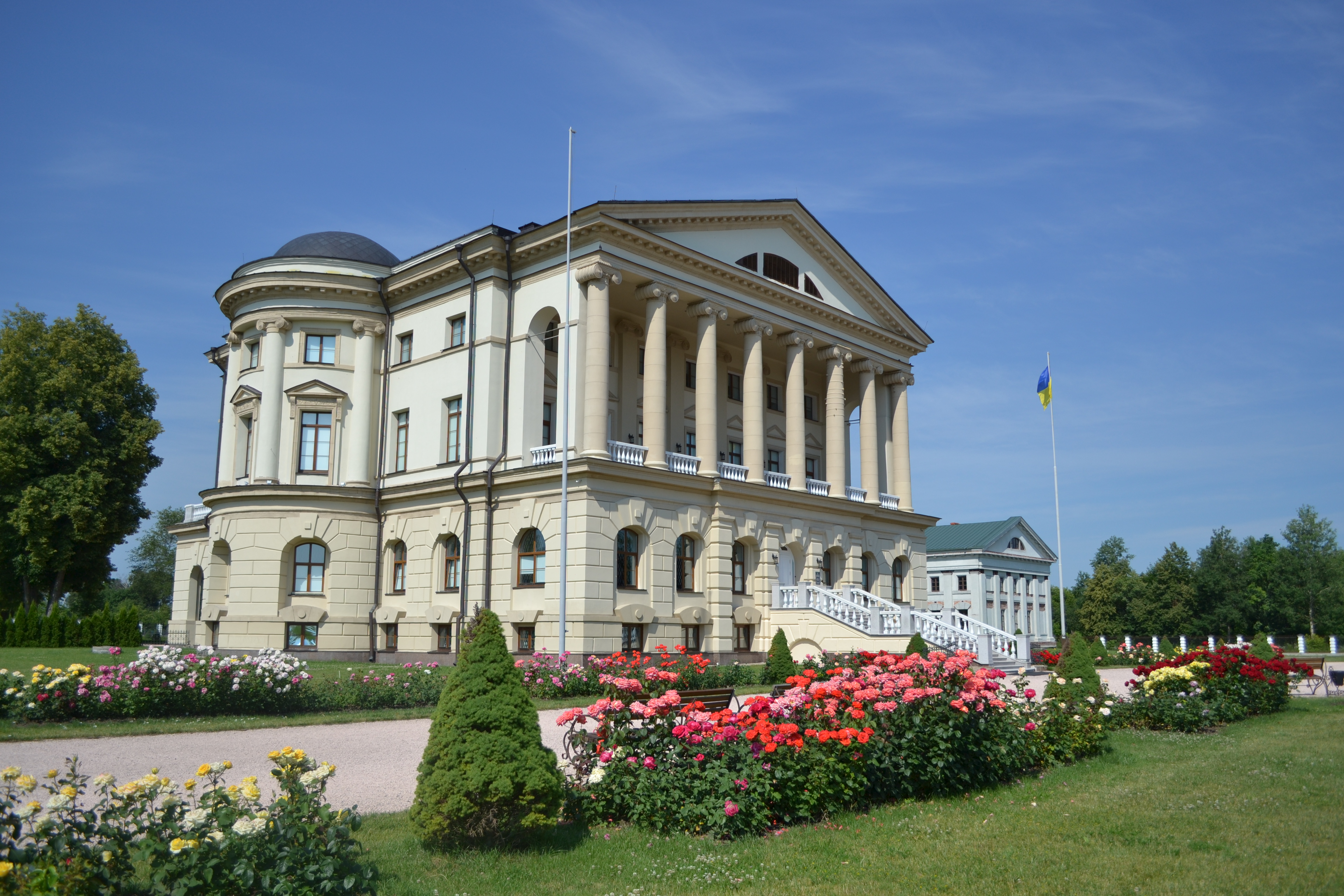
Kyrylo Rozumovskyi's Palace in Baturyn

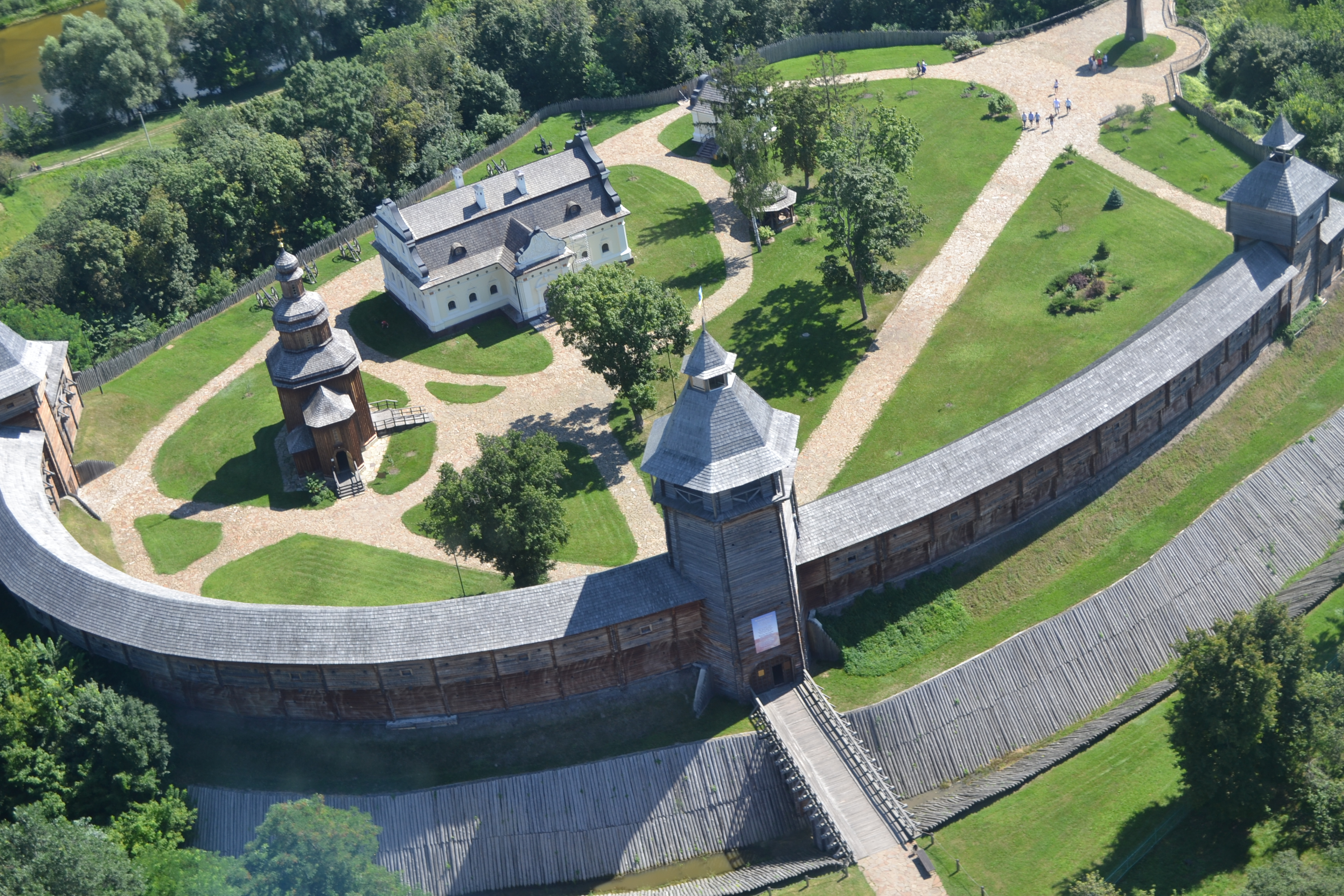
Baturyn Fortress Citadel

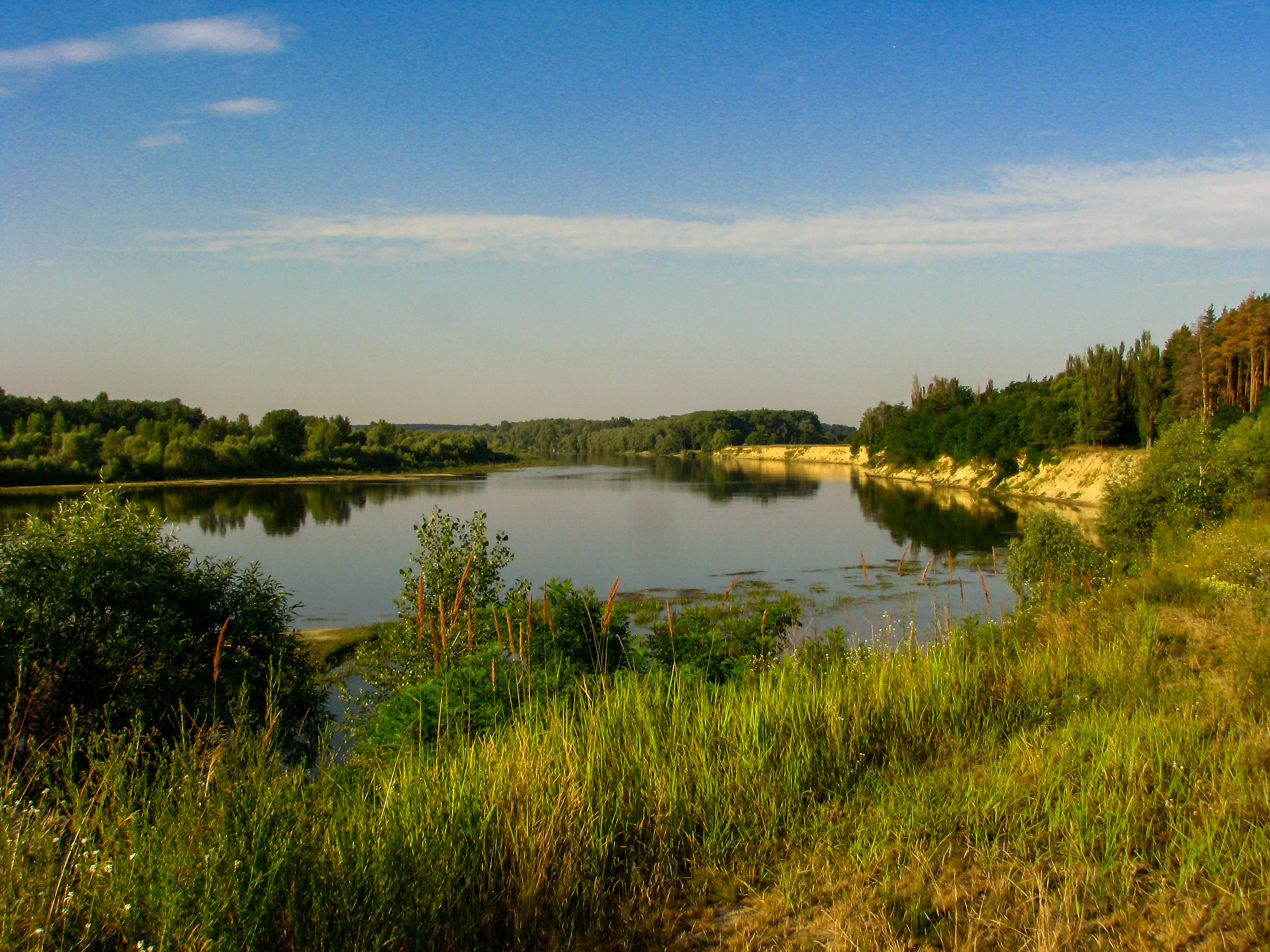
Mizhrichynskyi Regional Landscape Park

== See also ==
- Administrative divisions of Ukraine
- Chernihiv Regiment
- Chernihiv Governorate
- List of villages in Chernihiv Oblast
