= Borzna Raion =

Former subdivision of Chernihiv Oblast, Ukraine

Borzna Raion Борзнянський район
- Raion
- Flag Coat of arms

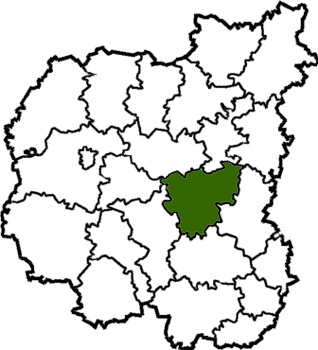
- Raion location in Chernihiv Oblast
- Coordinates: 51°14′59″N 32°22′2″E
- Country: Ukraine
- Oblast: Chernihiv Oblast
- Established: 1923
- Disestablished: 18 July 2020
- Admin. center: Borzna

Area
  - Total: 1,600 km^{2} (620 sq mi)

Population (2020)
  - Total: 29,500
  - Density: 18/km^{2} (48/sq mi)
- Time zone: UTC+2 (EET)
  - Summer (DST): UTC+3 (EEST)
- Website: borzadm.cg.gov.ua

Borzna Raion (Ukrainian: Борзнянський район) was a raion (district) of Chernihiv Oblast, northern Ukraine. Its administrative centre was located at the city of Borzna. The raion was abolished on 18 July 2020 as part of the administrative reform of Ukraine, which reduced the number of raions of Chernihiv Oblast to five. The area of Borzna Raion was merged into Nizhyn Raion. The last estimate of the raion population was 29,500 (2020 est.)

== Subdivisions ==
At the time of disestablishment, the raion consisted of four hromadas:

- Borzna urban hromada with the administration in Borzna;
- Komarivka rural hromada with the administration in the selo of Komarivka;
- Plysky rural hromada with the administration in the selo of Plysky;
- Vysoke rural hromada with the administration in the selo of Vysoke.

== Geography ==
Borzna Raion was founded in 1923. Its area made up 5% of the oblast territory. The region was situated almost at the center of the oblast and bordered on Mena Raion, Sosnytsia Raion, Korop Raion, Bakhmach Raion, Ichnia Raion, Nizhyn Raion, and Kulykivka Raion.

The raion covered an area of 1,600 square kilometres.

There were 63 built-up areas in the region, which were subordinated by the town council and by the 26 village councils.

The landscape of the territory is mainly plain, the northern part is somewhat waterlogged, with woods (pine-trees, alder-trees, oaks, aspen-trees), small rivers and lakes. The biggest river is Desna with Seim and Borzenka inflows.

The soil is mainly chernozem, meadow-chernozem, ash-laden and sod-ash-laden. The region is located on the south border of the mixed forest zone. Among minerals there are peat, industrial supply of clay and sand.

The region was intersected by the international highway Moscow—Kyiv (European route E101); the railways are going in two directions, the biggest stations for freight transport and passenger traffic were Doch, Plysky and Kruty.

== Economics ==
The economy of the region is mostly represented in agriculture. On the fields of 42 farms are grown potatoes, wheats, crops. The products are made out of cattle breeding, the poultry farming.

The growth of production in agriculture is stimulating the development of the food industry. The high quality grain alcohol is produced at the Shabalynivskiy alcohol-factory, which is the biggest industrial factory of the region. Borznaagroinvest produces 12 types of groats and the high quality flour. Borznaagroptakhproduct is incarnating more than 500 thousand poultry in a season. Komarivskiy molokozavod is the only in Ukraine that produces cheese of double fattiness and about 16 types of dairy products. Fabryka pechyva Borzna produces 14 types of cookies, which are supplied to more than 100 trading organizations in Ukraine. The Sausage plant rayspozhyvspilky produces more than 15 tons of sausages per year. Borznyanskiy khlibozavod, apart from the main products, produces 13 types of soft drinks. In the region area, besides the big processing factories, there are village small bakeries, which provide the local citizens with bread.

== Culture and tourism ==
The cultural places of the region are: 28 palaces of culture, 14 clubs, 1 movie theatre, 42 public libraries, musical school, the museum of history and the folk theatre.

An historical-memorial complex Hannyna Pustyn (commemorating a famous Ukrainian writer and activist of the 19th century Panteleimon Kulish and a peasant life writer Hanna Barvinok (husband and wife) is a ten-minute drive away from Borzna in the village of Motronivka. Borzna has a Museum of Oleksandr Sayenko (an original artist who, despite being deaf and dumb, gained prominence by inventing his own technique of creating pictures out of straw).

At the beginning of the 19th century there were 5 stone churches in Borzna: Troizkiy cathedral (17th century), church of the Nativity (1788, in 1905 the cathedral was rebuilt), St. Nicholas church (1768, was finished in 1903), the Bell tower (1864), Blagovishchenska church (1717) and Voskresenska (1857). During the last couple of years the following churches were restored: St. Nicholas church, Church of the Nativity, St. Vasyl church and others.

== Gallery ==
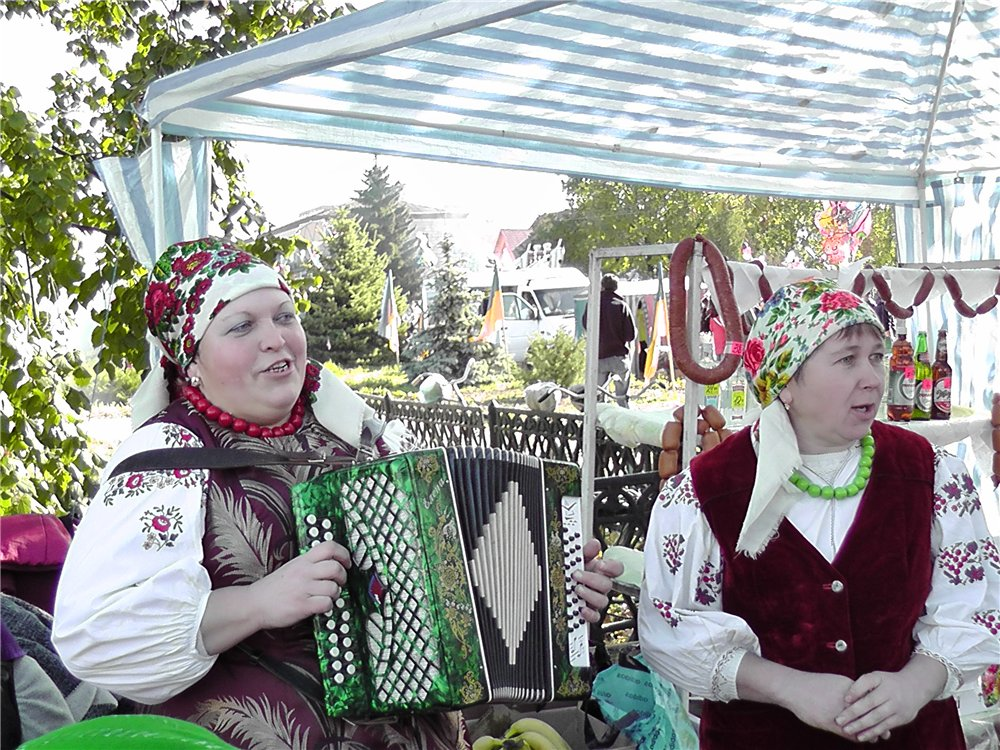
Pokrovskyi fair in Borzna

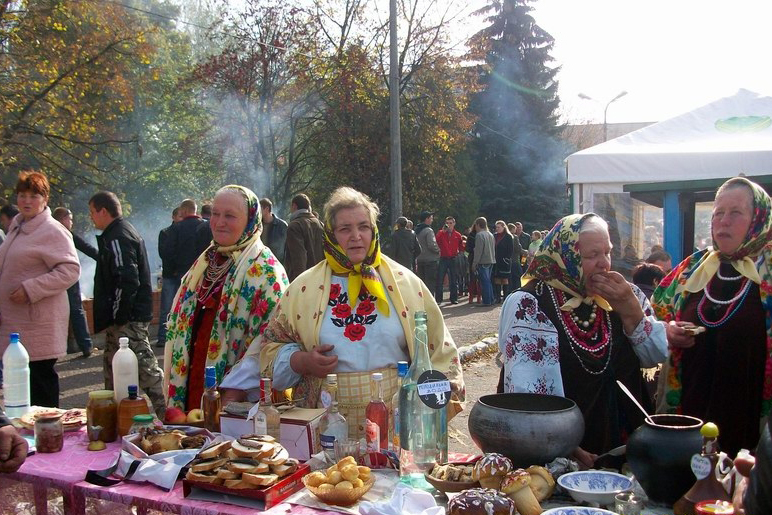
Pokrovskyi fair in Borzna

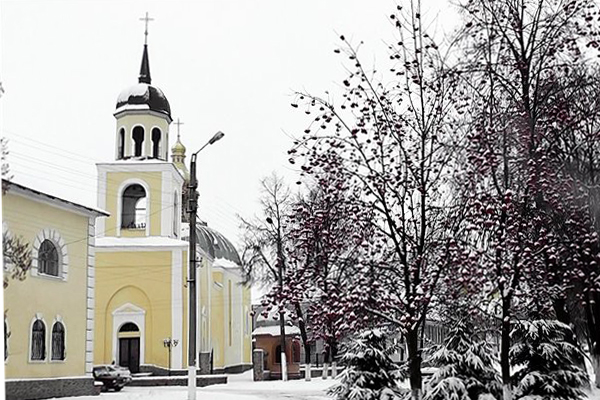
St. Nicholas Church

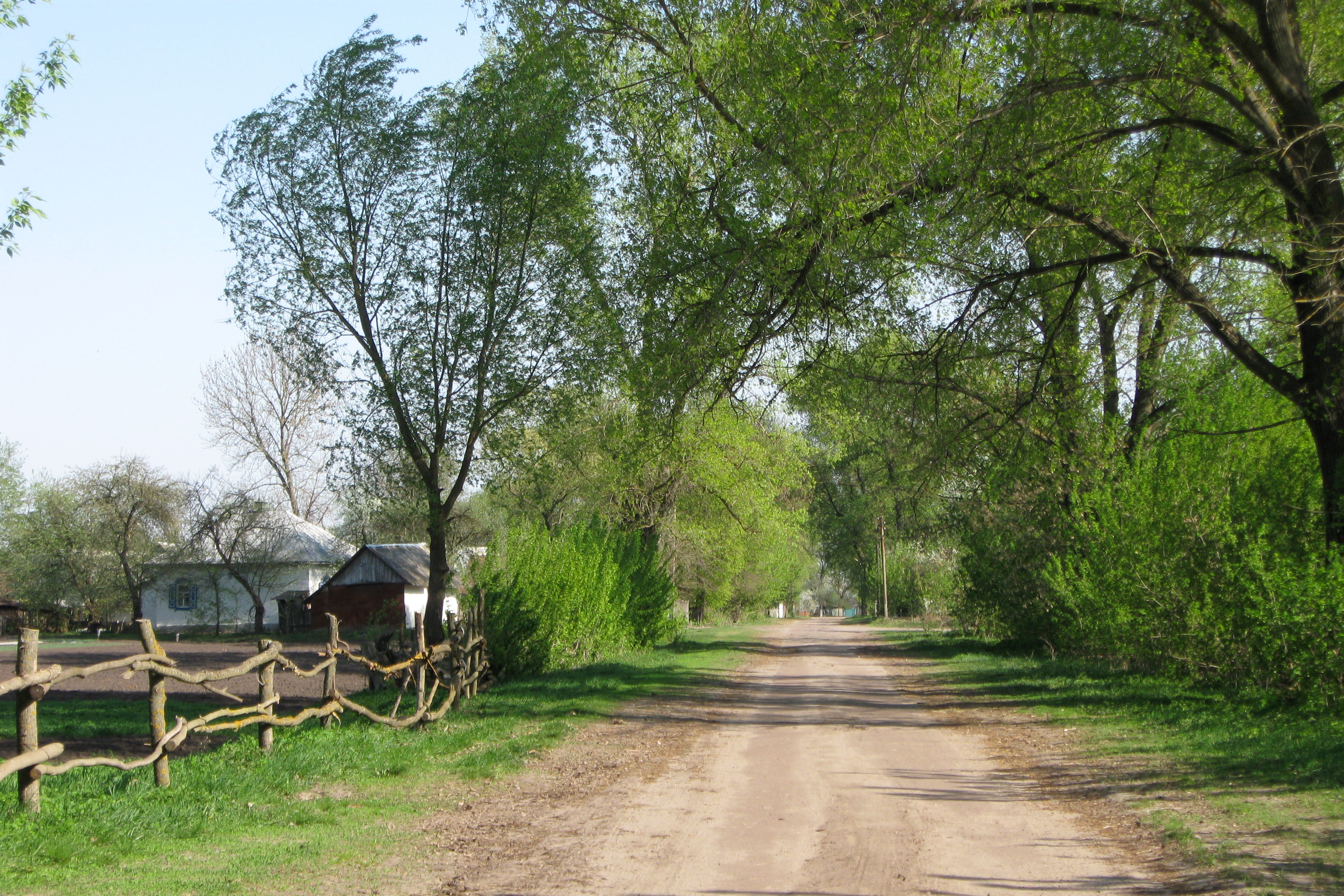
Khoroshe Ozero

== Bibliography ==
- Історія міст і сіл Української CCP — Чернігівська область (1972) (History of Towns and Villages of the Ukrainian SSR — Chernihiv Oblast), Kiev. (in Ukrainian)
- Martin Dimnik (2003). The Dynasty of Chernigov, 1146–1246. Campridge University Press. ISBN 0-521-82442-7.
- David S. DuVal. (2004). Ukrainian Soul: The Story Of The Family Volkoff From Borzna. Lincoln, NE: iUniverse. — 193 p. ISBN 0-595-31967-X
