= Ombysh =

Village in Chernihiv Oblast, Ukraine

Ombysh Омбиш
- Location of Ombysh Ombysh (Ukraine)
- Coordinates: 51°03′19″N 32°19′29″E
- Country: Ukraine
- Oblast: Chernihiv Oblast
- Raion: Nizhyn Raion

Population (2012)
  - Total: 696
- Postal code: 16463
- Climate: Cfa

Ombysh (Ukrainian: Омбиш) is a village in Nizhyn Raion, Chernihiv Oblast (province) of Ukraine. It belongs to Kruty rural hromada, one of the hromadas of Ukraine.

Ombysh was previously located in the Borzna Raion. The raion was abolished on 18 July 2020 as part of the administrative reform of Ukraine, which reduced the number of raions of Chernihiv Oblast to seven. The area of Borzna Raion was merged into Nizhyn Raion.

== Demographics ==
As of the 2001 Ukrainian census, Ombysh had a population of 696 inhabitants. The exact native language composition was as follows:

Languages in Ombysh
	percent
Ukrainian	99.3%
Russian	0.7%
others	0.0%

== Notable people ==
- Volodymyr Zamana (born 1959), colonel general
- Stepan Bulba (born 1950), politician
