= Nosivka Raion =

Former subdivision of Chernihiv Oblast, Ukraine

Nosivka Raion Носівський район
- Raion
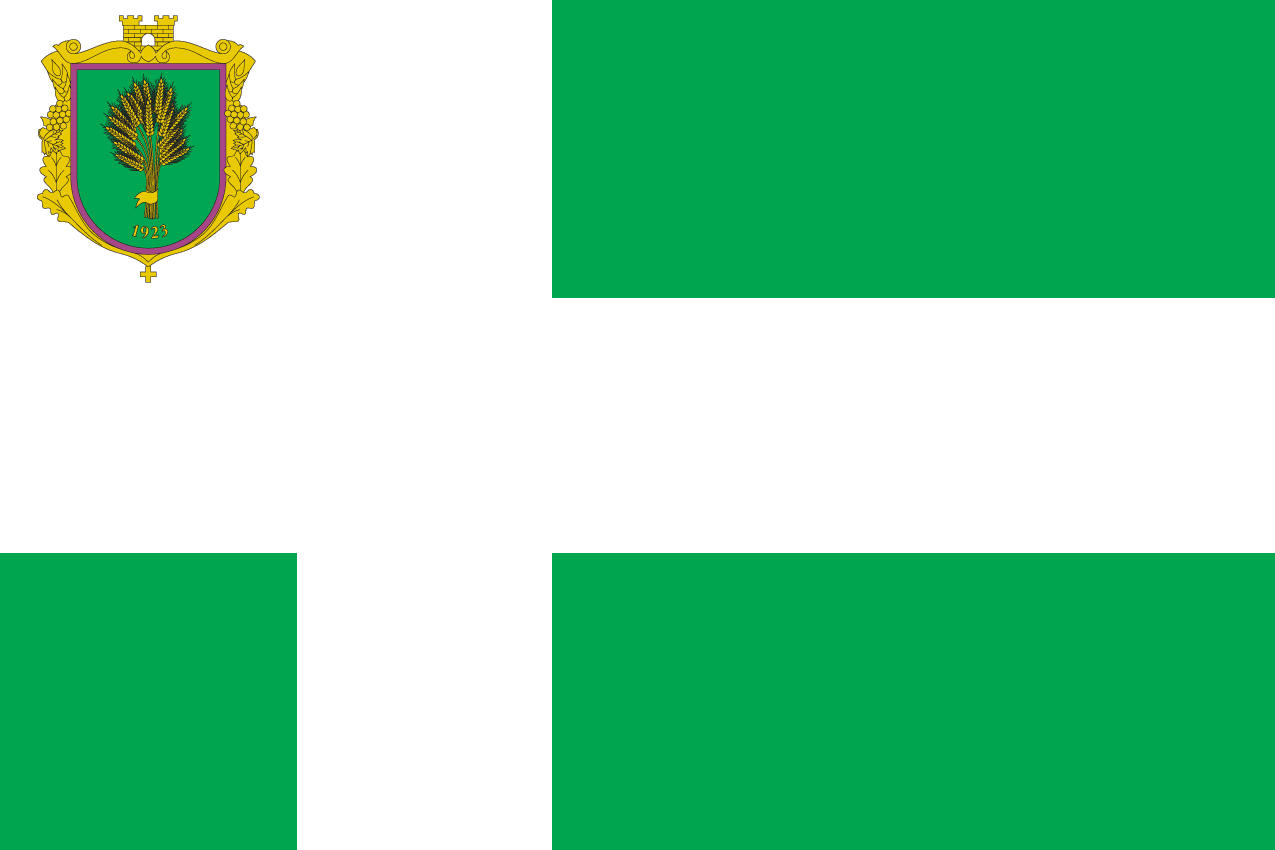
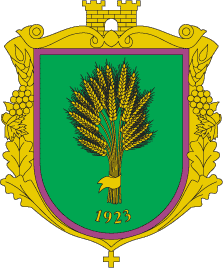
- Flag Coat of arms

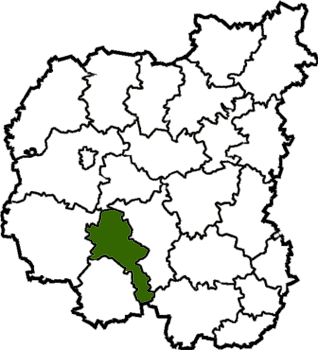
- Raion location in Chernihiv Oblast
- Coordinates: 50°57′6″N 31°36′12″E
- Country: Ukraine
- Oblast: Chernihiv Oblast
- Disestablished: 18 July 2020
- Admin. center: Nosivka

Area
  - Total: 1,151 km^{2} (444 sq mi)

Population (2020)
  - Total: 27,749
  - Density: 24.11/km^{2} (62.44/sq mi)
- Time zone: UTC+2 (EET)
  - Summer (DST): UTC+3 (EEST)
- Website: http://nosadm.cg.gov.ua/

Nosivka Raion (Ukrainian: Носівський район) was a raion (district) of Chernihiv Oblast, northern Ukraine. Its administrative centre was located at the city of Nosivka. The raion was abolished on 18 July 2020 as part of the administrative reform of Ukraine, which reduced the number of raions of Chernihiv Oblast to five. The area of Nosivka Raion was merged into Nizhyn Raion. The last estimate of the raion population was 27,749 (2020 est.)

At the time of disestablishment, the raion consisted of three hromadas:

- Makiivka rural hromada with the administration in the selo of Makiivka;
- Mryn rural hromada with the administration in the selo of Mryn;
- Nosivka urban hromada with the administration in Nosivka.
