= Borzna =

Urban locality in Chernihiv Oblast, Ukraine

Borzna Борзна Borsna
- City
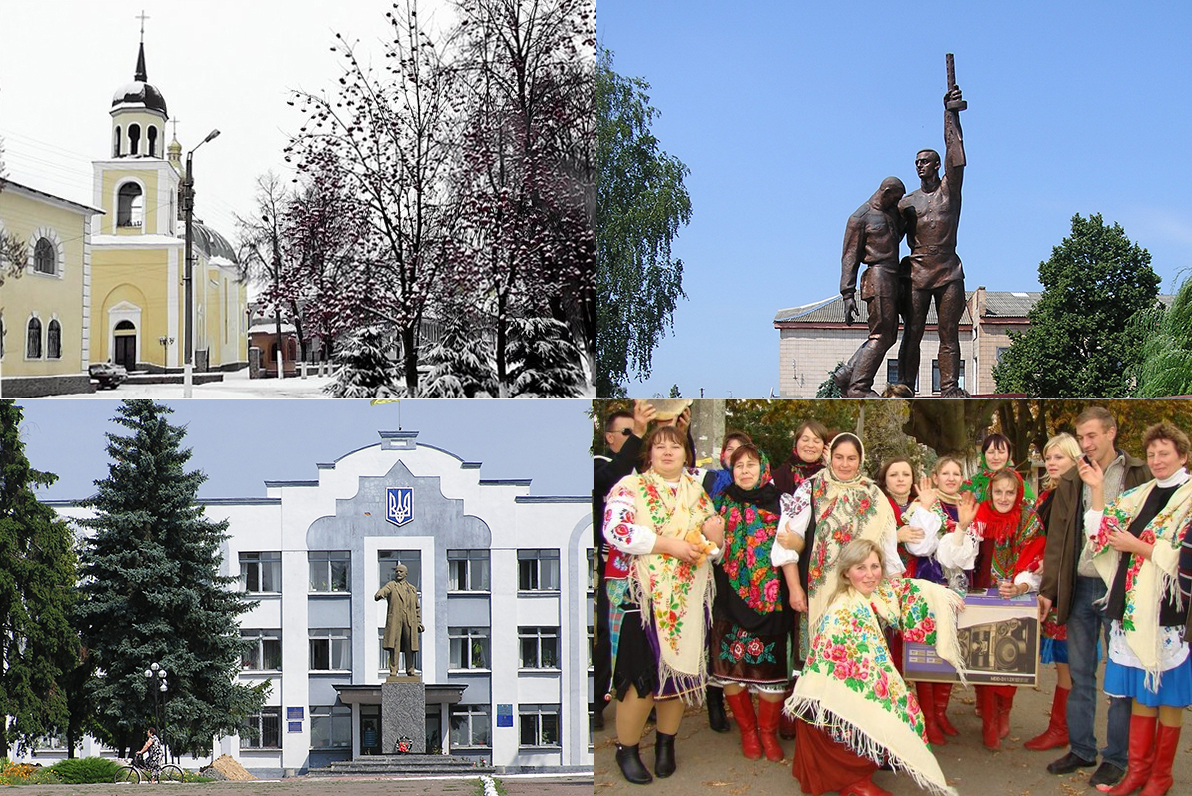
- Clockwise from top left: Saint Nicholas Church; Monument to the lost countrymen; Borzna Pokrovskyi Fair; City Hall and Vladimir Lenin statue (destroyed in February 2014 during Leninopad)

- Flag Coat of arms

- Location of Borzna Borzna (Ukraine)
- Coordinates: 51°15′11″N 32°25′45″E
- Country: Ukraine
- Oblast: Chernihiv Oblast
- Raion: Nizhyn Raion
- Hromada: Borzna urban hromada
- Founded: 16th century
- City status on: 1966

Government
  - Mayor: Anatoliy Koyda

Area
  - Total: 107.8 km^{2} (41.6 sq mi)

Population (2022)
  - Total: 9,454 ▼
  - Density: 87.70/km^{2} (227.1/sq mi)
- Time zone: UTC+2 (EET)
  - Summer (DST): UTC+3 (EEST)
- Postal code: 16400-
- Area code: +380-4653

Borzna (Ukrainian: Борзна, pronounced [borzˈnɑ]), also referred to as Borsna, is a city in Nizhyn Raion, Chernihiv Oblast, northern Ukraine. It hosts the administration of Borzna urban hromada, one of the hromadas of Ukraine. Population: 9,454 (2022 estimate).

== Geography ==
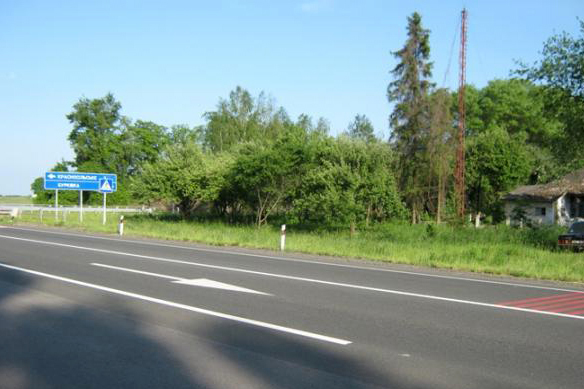
International E-road E101 near Borzna

Borzna is located on the Desna, next to an international highway connecting Kyiv and Moscow (E101). Chernihiv is about 100 km (62 mi) away. Borzna has no railway (the nearest railway stations being Doch (14 km or 9 mi) with north–south routes and Plysky (20 km or 12 mi) with west–east routes.

The city derives its name from the river it lies on, a tributary of the Desna.

=== Climate ===
Borzna has a humid continental climate (Koppen Dfb). The warmest months are June, July, and August, with mean temperatures of 19 °C (66 °F). The coldest are December, January, and February, with mean temperatures of −7 °C (19 °F). The highest ever temperature recorded in the town was 41.3 °C (106.3 °F) in July 2010. The coldest temperature ever recorded in the city was −35.9 °C (−32.6 °F) in January 1987. Snow cover usually lies from mid-November to the end of March, with the frost-free period lasting 180 days on average, but surpassing 200 days in recent years.

== History ==
Evidence of settlement in the area of present-day Borzna dates back to the Neolithic era, with Bronze Age and Scythian remains also having been unearthed. According to some modern writers, the earliest fortress (8th—13th centuries) would have been destroyed by the Batu Khan in the 1239.

Borzna was known during the 16th century as selishche, a farming community. As Borzna, it was founded in 1633. The area had been part of the Polish–Lithuanian Commonwealth (in the Kijów Voivodeship of the Crown of Poland) since before the Union of Lublin. Control of the town was wrested from the Commonwealth during the Khmelnytsky Uprising, after which natives of Ukraine gained some degree of autonomy under Hetman Bohdan Khmelnytsky and his Cossack state. In 1648, Borzna was transformed into the centre of Borzna Regiment, and in 1650 administrative seat of a sotnia of the Nizhyn Regiment. Ivan Korsak (Иван Корсак-Кулаженко), the sotnyk (leader of a sotnia) of the city of Borzna, was ennobled on October 1, 1684.

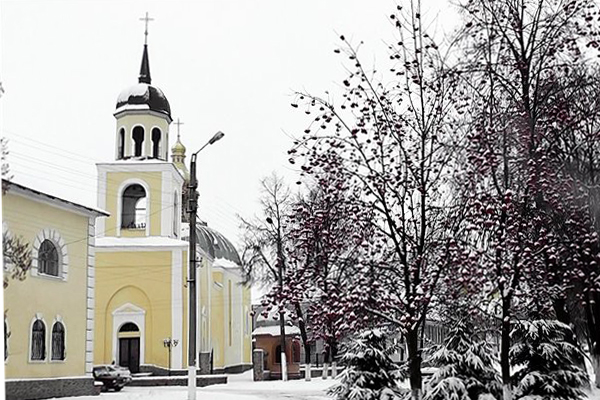
St. Nicholas Church in Borzna. Built in the mid-19th century

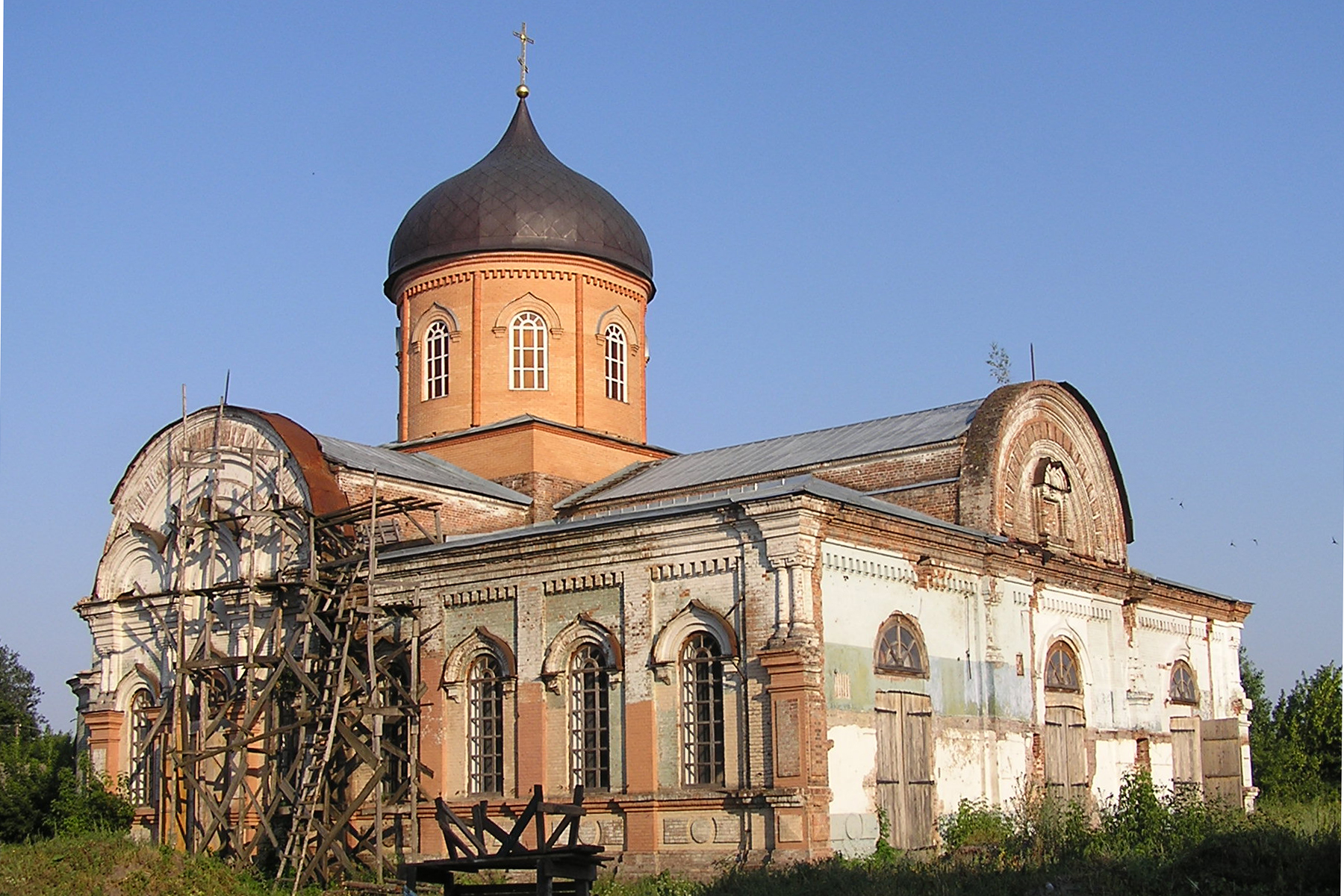
Church of the Nativity, built in the late 19th century

By 1634 Borzna was granted Magdeburg Rights.

After 1654, the town became part of the Tsardom of Russia and became a county town in the Chernigov Governorate in 1782, adopting the emblem of the Russian period.

240 families of Cossacks and 180 families of peasants lived in the town of Borzna in 1748. According to the census of 1859 the total population of the town of Borzna was 8,453.

Because of its distance from the railway (14 km), the city's population grew slowly (1897 pop 8,582). From 1923 Borzna was the administrative center of the Borznyanskyi raion (Borzna district).

In World War II, the town was occupied by Nazi Germany from September 11, 1941, to September 7, 1943. On January 18, 1942, the Germans, with the support of Ukrainian police, rounded up all the local Jews they could find and massacred them at Shapovalivka. 126 people were killed, 179 removed to Germany.

On August 26, 1966, Borzna was attributed to the category of cities of district subordination.

Until 18 July 2020, Borzna was the administrative center of Borzna Raion. The raion was abolished in July 2020 as part of the administrative reform of Ukraine, which reduced the number of raions of Chernihiv Oblast to five. The area of Borzna Raion was merged into Nizhyn Raion.

== Nowadays ==
While the town benefits from vast farming lands surrounding it, it also has a metalwork and electronic chips plant, a brick factory, a lumber-processing factory, and a food industry. Among its educational institutions, there is an Agricultural Technicum, Panteleimon Kulish Gymnasium, and Khrystyna Alchevska secondary school, as well as a musical school.

Borzna has a concert hall (The House of Culture), Museum of Oleksandr Sayenko (an original artist who, despite being deaf and dumb, gained prominence by inventing his own technique of creating pictures out of straw), Museum of History, and an historical-memorial complex Hannyna Pustyn (commemorating a famous Ukrainian writer and activist of the 19th century Panteleimon Kulish and a peasant life writer Hanna Barvinok, (husband and wife) which is a ten-minute drive away in the nearby village of Motronivka.

The local newspaper the Visti Borznyanshchyny (English: The Borzna Herald) is published twice a week. The local community also operates a radio station which regularly produces programs about local events.

== Notable people ==
- Oleksandr Murashko — painter (1875-1919)
- Panteleimon Kulish — writer, critic, poet, folklorist, and translator
- Semen Paliy — Ukrainian Cossack polkovnyk (colonel)
- Ivan Plyushch — Ukrainian politician and former chairman of the Verkhovna Rada (Ukrainian parliament)
- Pavlo Polubotok — Acting Hetman of the Cossack era of Ukraine
- Ivan Kharchenko — Hero of the Soviet Union, awarded for the World War II battles, born in the village Komarivka, former Borzna Raion
- Nazar Voloshyn (born 2000), Ukrainian footballer

== Gallery ==
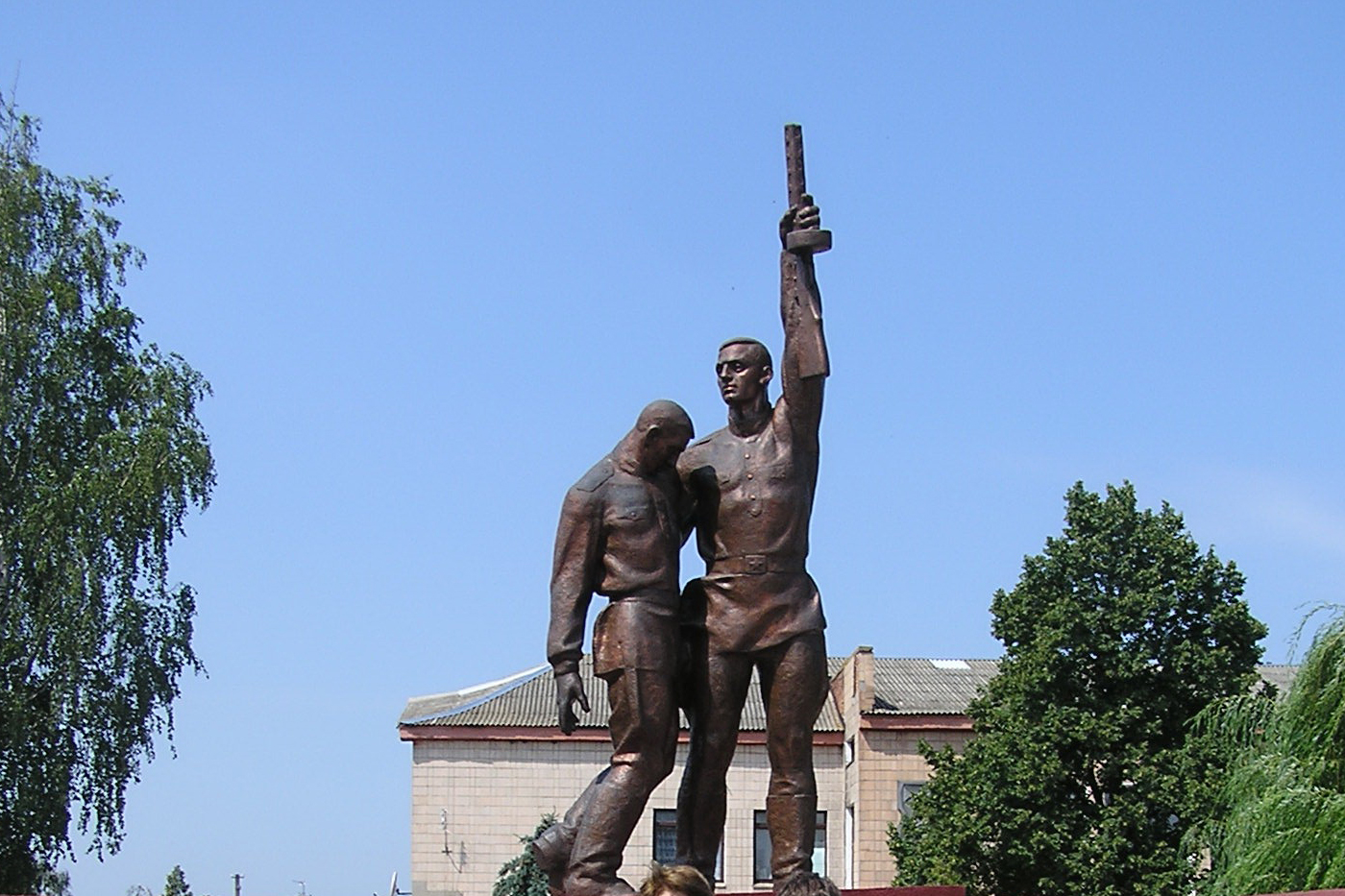
Monument to the lost countrymen

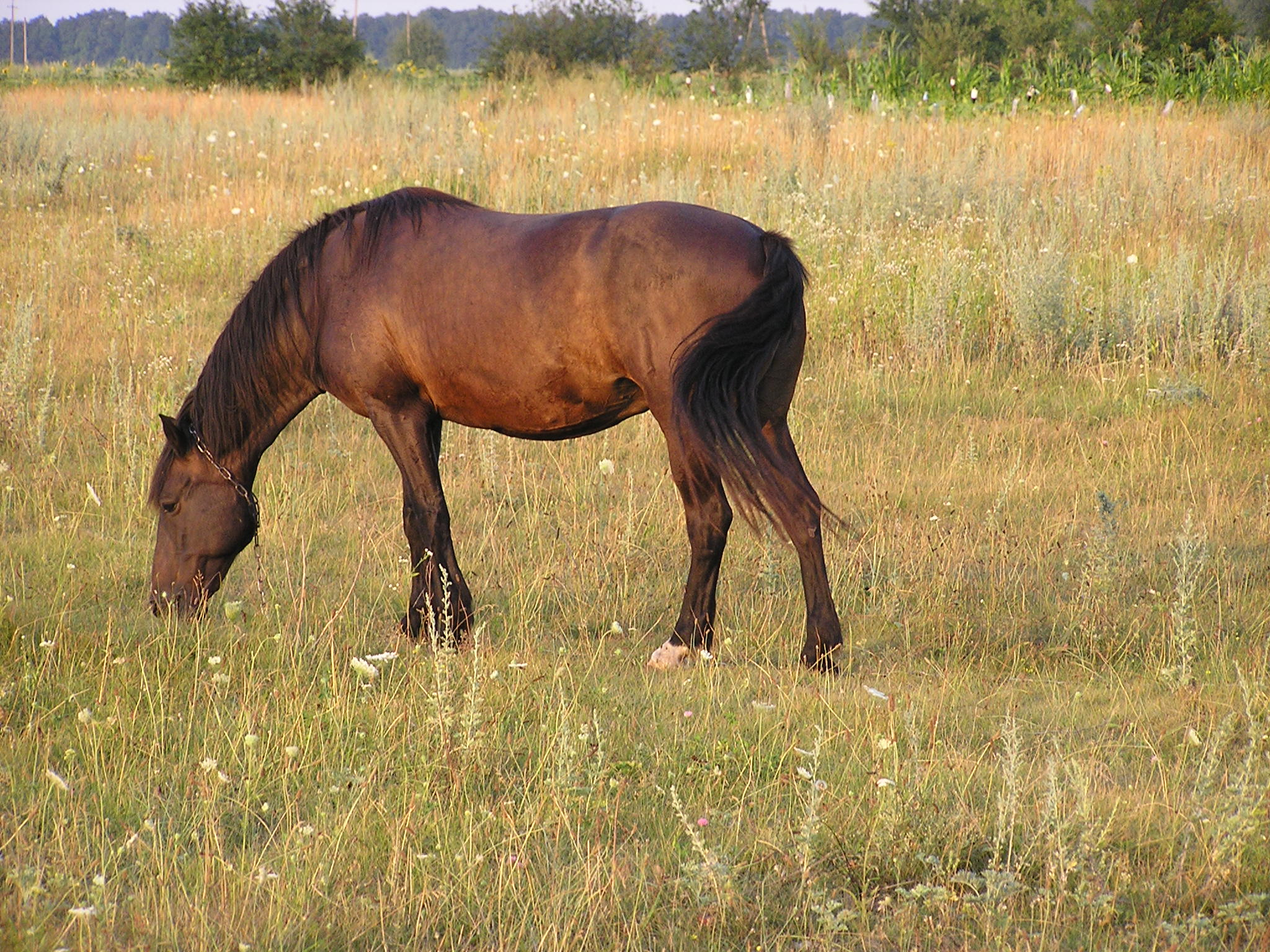
Meadows near Borzna

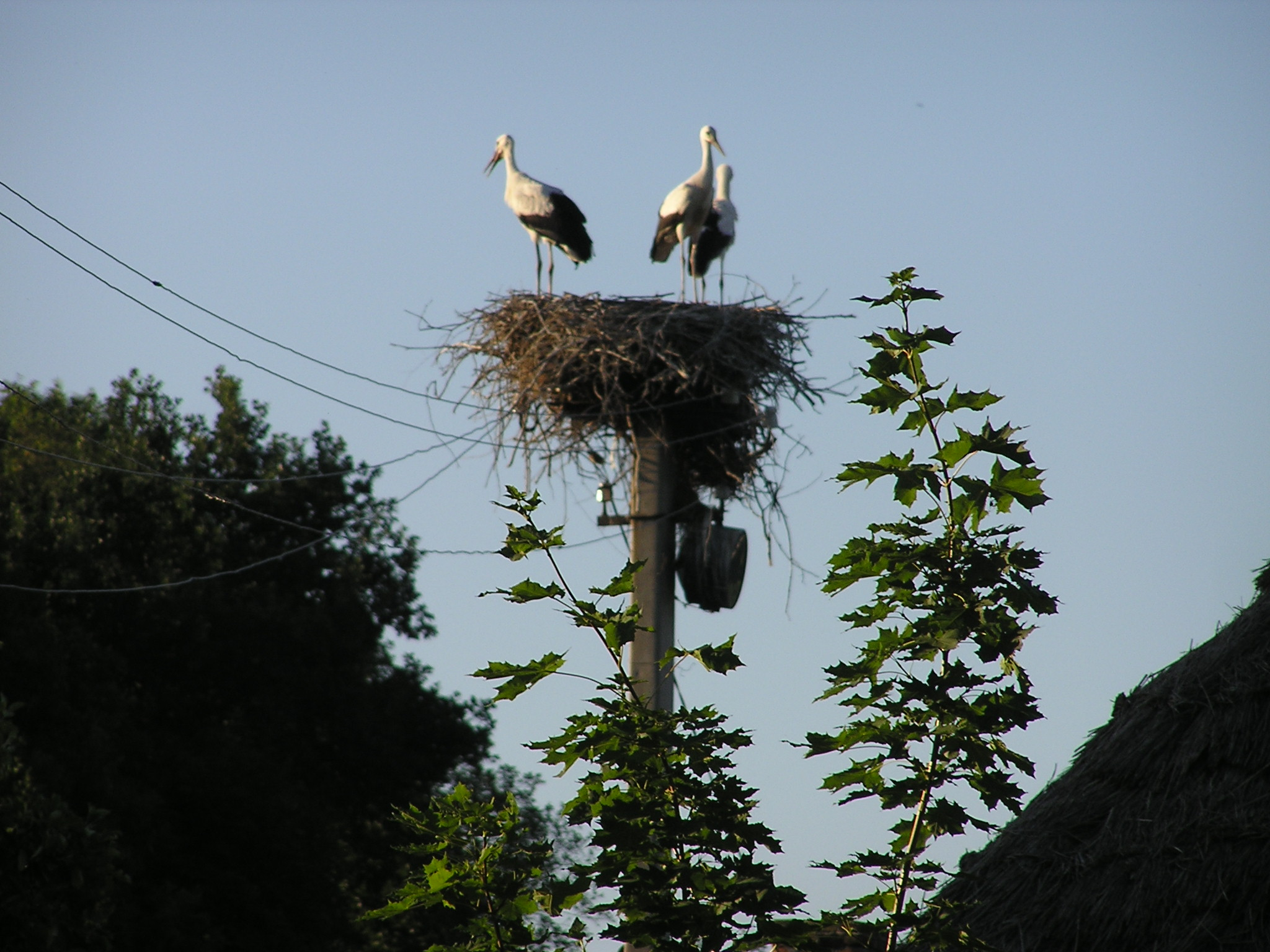
A stork nest

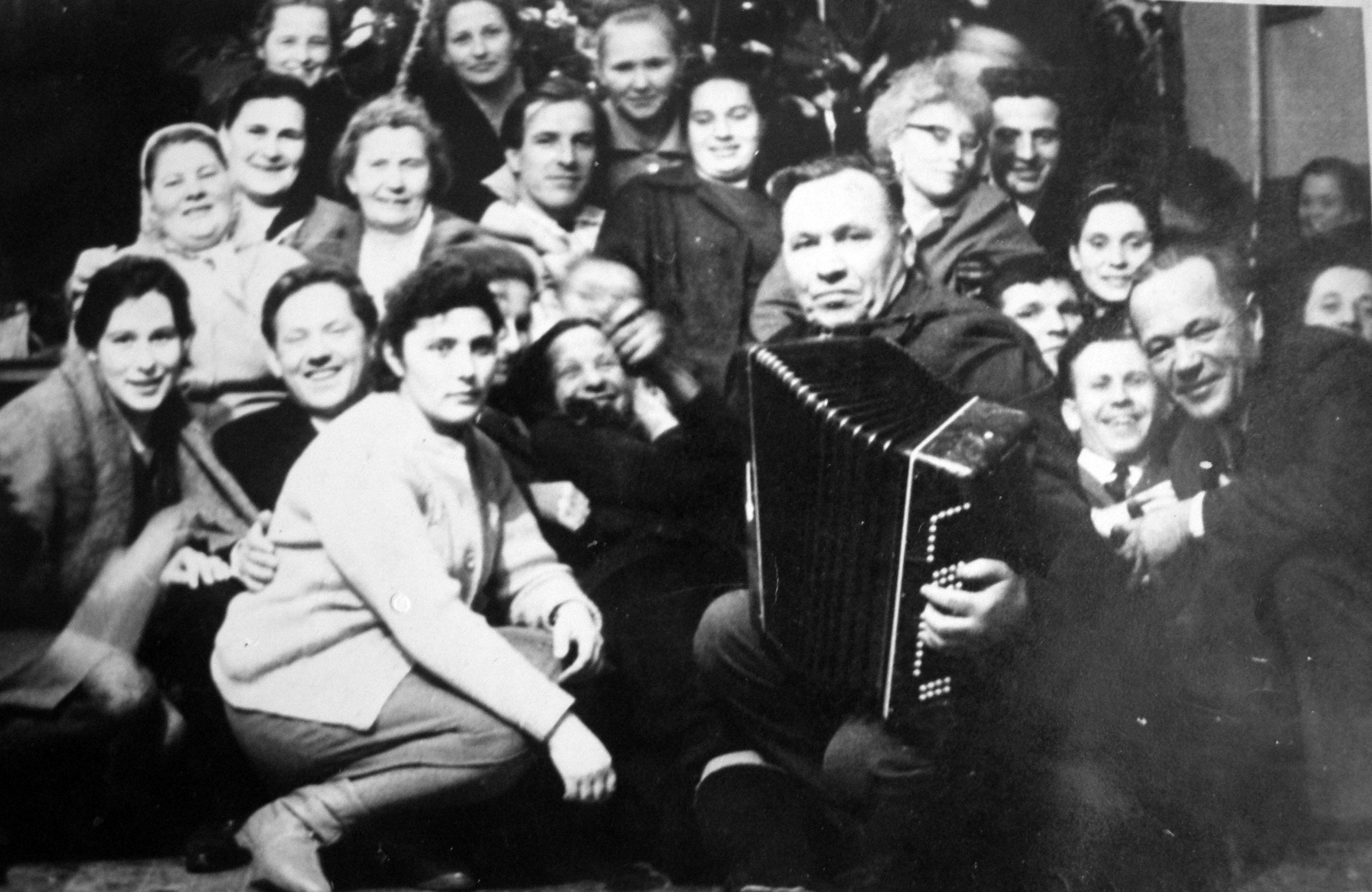
New Year's Eve, 1967

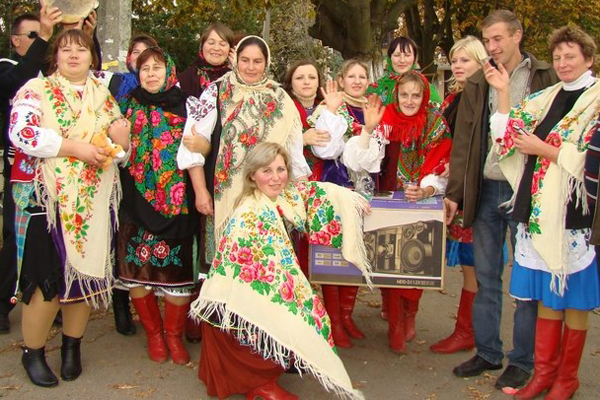
Pokrovskyi Fair

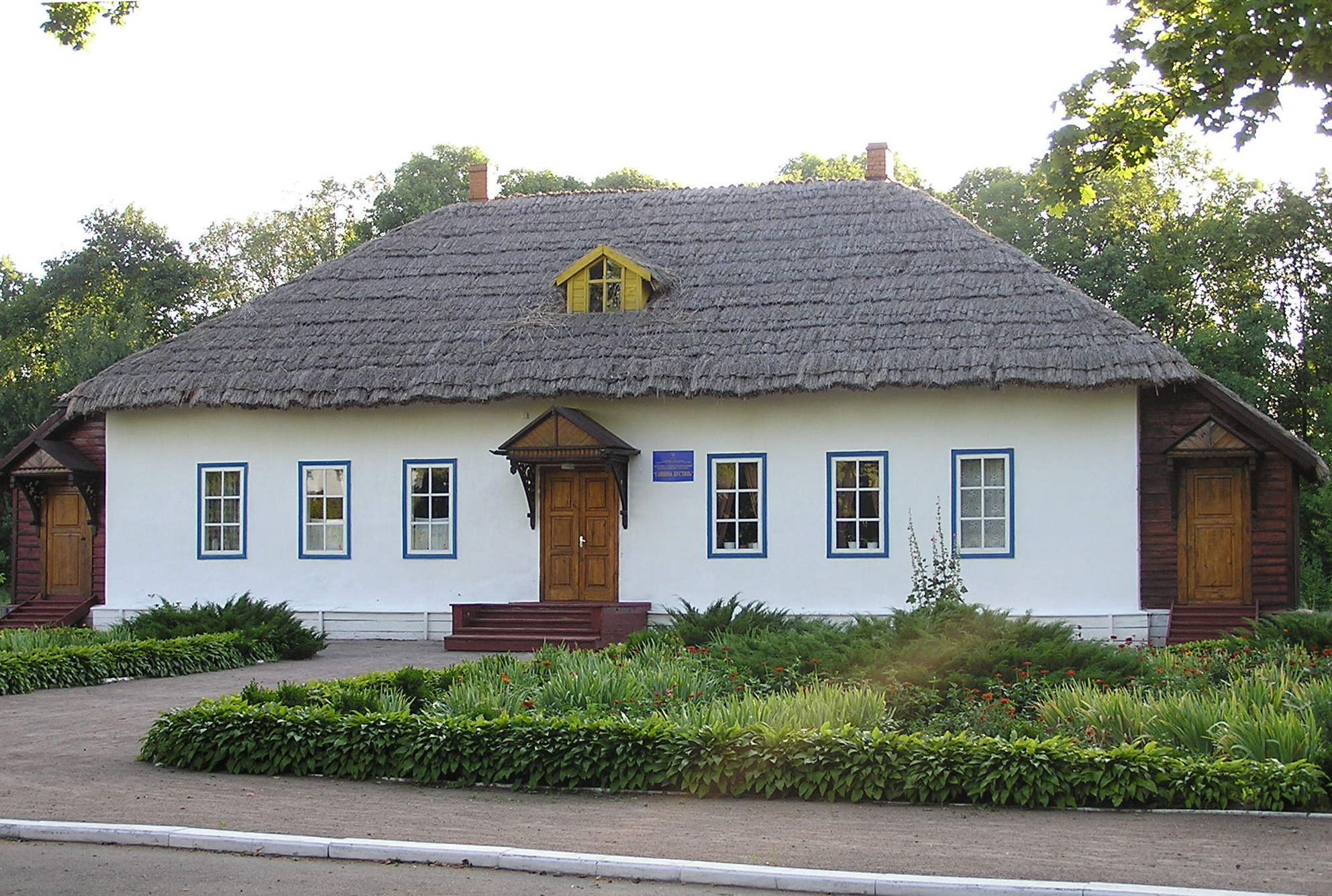
Historical-memorial complex Hannyna Pustyn

== Bibliography ==
- Історія міст і сіл Української CCP — Чернігівська область (1972) (History of Towns and Villages of the Ukrainian SSR — Chernihiv Oblast), Kiev. (in Ukrainian)
- Martin Dimnik (2003). The Dynasty of Chernigov, 1146-1246. Campridge University Press. ISBN 0-521-82442-7.
- David S. DuVal. (2004). Ukrainian Soul: The Story Of The Family Volkoff From Borzna. Lincoln, NE: iUniverse. — 193 p. ISBN 0-595-31967-X
