= Alla Kudlai =

Ukrainian singer (born 1954)

Alla Petrivna Kudlai (Ukrainian: Алла Петрівна Кудлай; born 23 July 1954) is a Ukrainian singer. In 1987 she was awarded Merited Artist of Ukraine (Заслужений артист України), and in 1997, People's Artist of Ukraine (Народний артист України)

== Early days and education ==
Kudlai was born in Losynivka, Nizhyn Raion, Chernihiv Oblast, and studied at Nizhyn Gogol State University.

== Career ==
In 1978 Kudlai joined the Veryovka Ukrainian Folk Choir.

In 1984 she became a soloist of the Ukrainian State Television and Radio symphony orchestra.

In 2003 she performed three sold-out solo concerts at the National Palace of Culture to celebrate 25 years of her career.

She is godmother to Nastya Kamensky.
