= Borzna Regiment =

Borzna Regiment Борзнянський полк
- Coat of Arms
- Active: 1648—1649; 1654—1655
- Country: Cossack Hetmanate
- Type: Cossack Regiment
- Size: 9 sotnias (1648); 5 sotnias (1654)
- Garrison/HQ: Borzna, Ukraine
- Engagements: Khmelnytsky Uprising; Russo-Polish War (1654–1667); 3rd siege of Bykhaw

Commanders
- Notable commanders: Petro Zabila

The Borzna Regiment (Ukrainian: Борзнянський полк, romanized: Borznianskyi polk) was one the territorial-administrative subdivisions of the Cossack Hetmanate. The regiment's capital was the city of Borzna, now in Chernihiv Oblast of northern Ukraine.

Regiment was raised by colonel Petro Zabila on territory of Borzna Volost in 1648, during Khmelnytsky Uprising. Shortly after Treaty of Zboriv, in 1649, the regiment was disbanded. The regiments sotnias were all transferred to Chernihiv Regiment.

The regiment was reactivated in 1654 as part of preparations for Invasion of the Polish–Lithuanian Commonwealth, with colonel Petro Zabila becoming commander once again. The regiment tok part in third siege of Bykhaw in October 1654. Zabila was replaced as colonel of the regiment by Samiilo Kurbatskyi in 1655. After its abolishment in 1655, all of the sotnias were transferred to Nizhyn Regiment.

== Structure ==
The regiment comprised 9 sotnias during 1648-1649:

- Borzna
- Ivanhorod
- Syvolozh
- Bakhmach
- Olenivka
- Baturyn
- Konotop
- Korop
- Hlukhiv

The regiment comprised 5 sotnias during 1654-1655:

- Borzna 1
- Borzna 2
- Bakhmach
- Kustovka
- Nove Misto

== Commanders ==
All commanders were Colonels.

- Petro Zabila 1648-1649, 1654-1655
- Samiilo Kurbatskyi 1655

== Sources ==
- Заруба, Віктор (2007), Адміністративно-територіальний устрій та адміністрація Війська Запорозького у 1648-1782 рр. [Administrative-territorial structure and administration of the Zaporizhzhya Army in 1648-1782.] (in Ukrainian), Dnipro: Lira, ISBN 978-966-383-095-7
- Bodyansky, Osip (1974), РЕЕСТРА ВСЕГО ВОЙСКА ЗАПОРОЖСКАГО ПОСЛѢ ЗБОРОВСКАГО ДОГОВОРА [Register of all Zaporozhian Host after Treaty of Zboriv] (in Russian), Moscow: Imperial Moscow University
