= Ivan Kharchenko =

Hero of the Soviet Union (1918–1989)

Ivan Ustinovich Kharchenko
- Born: 23 September 1918; Komarivka, Chernigov Oblast, Ukrainian SSR (now Ukraine)
- Died: 1 July 1989 (aged 70); Kyiv, Ukrainian SSR, Soviet Union
- Burial place: Berkotets Cemetery, Kyiv, Ukraine
- Military career
- Allegiance: Soviet Union
- Branch: Red Army
- Service years: 1938–1964
- Rank: Colonel
- Units: 31 Detached Engineering and anti-gas battalion of Local Anti-Aircraft Defence troops, NKVD
- Conflicts: World War II; Battle of Stalingrad; Battle of Kiev
- Awards: Hero of the Soviet Union

Ivan Ustinovich Kharchenko (Ukrainian: Іван Устинович Харченко; Russian: Ива́н Усти́нович Ха́рченко; 23 September 1918 – 1 July 1989) was a Soviet Army military engineering colonel and Hero of the Soviet Union. During World War II, he was a platoon commander. Kharchenko was promoted to the rank of junior lieutenant in 1939, lieutenant in 1943 and senior lieutenant in 1944. He reportedly personally defused more than 50,000 explosives, including bombs, mines, and shells. For his actions in defusing explosives, Kharchenko was named a Hero of the Soviet Union and awarded the Gold Star and Order of Lenin on 2 November 1944. In the citation for the Hero of the Soviet Union award, it was stated that Kharchenko personally defused more than 1500 bombs weighing more than 500 kilograms each and 25,000 other explosive objects. After World War II, Kharchenko continued his military service until retirement in 1964. Until 1956 he was personally engaged in rendering innocuous explosive items left over from World War II.

In March 1961, the battalion commanded by Kharchenko led a rescue operation after the Kurenivka mudslide in Kyiv.

== Early life ==
Ivan Kharchenko was born on 23 September 1918 in Komarovka village of Nizhyn Uyezd in the Chernigov Governorate, to a peasant family. He graduated from seven classes and worked as a factory carpenter in Khimki. In 1938, Kharchenko joined the Red Army

== World War II ==
In 1941 Kharchenko became under-lieutenant and a platoon commander in the 22 Detached Engineering and anti-gas battalion of Local Anti-Aircraft Defence troops. In 1942 he came back to the unit where he had served in non-commissioned positions — to the 6th Engineering and anti-gas regiment of the NKVD antiaircraft defense troops. He helped to defuse more than 26,000 German shells, mines and bombs during the Battle of Stalingrad and the Battle of Kiev (1943). On 2 November 1944, he was awarded the title Hero of the Soviet Union and the Order of Lenin for his actions in defusing unexploded ordnance and mines.

== Postwar ==
After the end of World War II, Kharchenko defused more than 16,000 unexploded bombs, as well as other explosive devices. In 1950, he graduated from the High Officers' Engineering School in Moscow. In 1964, Kharchenko left military service and worked in the Ministry of Assembly and Special Construction Works in Kyiv until his retirement in 1986. He died on 1 July 1989 and is buried in the Berkovetskaya Cemetery.

== Military service ==
- 1938–1941 — 31st detached Engineering and Anti-gas battalion of the local Anti-Aircraft Defence troops, NKVD (Zaporizhia), cadet, squad leader, company's petty officer
- 1941 — the junior lieutenants courses in Leningrad Command school of the head department of Military Engineering, cadet
- 1941–1942 — 22nd detached Engineering and Anti-gas battalion of the local Anti-Aircraft Defence troops, NKVD (Gorky), a platoon leader
- 1942–1943 — 31st detached Engineering and Anti-gas battalion of the local Anti-Aircraft Defence troops, NKVD (Stalingrad), a platoon leader
- 1943–1945 — 6th Engineering and Anti-gas regiment of the local Anti-Aircraft Defence troops, NKVD (Kyiv), a platoon leader
- 1945–1951 — 6th Engineering and Anti-gas regiment of the local Anti-Aircraft Defence troops, Interior Ministry (Kyiv), a company commander
- 1951–1955 — 3rd detachment of the local Anti-Aircraft Defence troops, Interior Ministry (Kyiv), commander of a pyrotechnical team
- 1955–1956 — 6th Engineering and Anti-gas regiment of the local Anti-Aircraft Defence troops, Interior Ministry (Kyiv), commander of a pyrotechnical service
- 1956–1960 — 6th Engineering and Anti-gas regiment of the local Anti-Aircraft Defence troops, Interior Ministry (Kyiv), a battalion commander of engineers
- 1960–1962 — 120th Detached Engineering and Anti-gas regiment of the local Anti-Aircraft Defence troops, Soviet Army, Kyiv Military District (Kiev), a battalion commander of engineers
- 1962–1964 — Headquarters of the Civil Defence of Ukrainian SSR (Kyiv), officer in charge of combat training organisation

== Honors ==
- Hero of the Soviet Union (2 November 1944)
- Order of Lenin
- Order of the Red Banner
- Order of the Patriotic War, First Class
- Order of the Red Star
- Medal for Battle Merit
- Medal "For the Defence of Stalingrad"
- Medal "For the Victory over Germany in the Great Patriotic War 1941–1945"
- Honoured Member of the Interior Ministry of the USSR
