= Losynivka settlement hromada =

Losynivka settlement hromada Лосинівська селищна громада
- Hromada
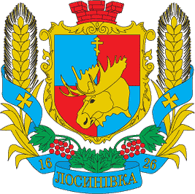
- Coat of arms
- Interactive map of Losynivka settlement hromada
- Country: Ukraine
- Oblast: Chernihiv
- Raion: Nizhyn

Area
  - Total: 355.8 km^{2} (137.4 sq mi)

Population (2020)
  - Total: 9,712
  - Density: 27.30/km^{2} (70.70/sq mi)
- CATOTTG code: UA74040190000070909
- Settlements: 20
- Villages: 19
- Towns: 1
- Website: losynivska-gromada.gov.ua

Losynivka settlement hromada (Ukrainian: Лосинівська селищна громада) is a hromada of Ukraine, located in Nizhyn Raion, Chernihiv Oblast. Its administrative center is the town of Losynivka.

It has an area of 355.8 square kilometres (137.4 mi^{2}) and a population of 9,712, as of 2020.

== Composition ==
The hromada includes 21 settlements: 1 town (Losynivka) and 19 villages:

- Bohdanivka
- Viktorivka
- Halytsia
- Harmashchyna
- Danina
- Kovtunivka
- Leonidivka
- Myrne
- Peremoha
- Pohrebets
- Sadove
- Salne
- Svitanok
- Stantsia Losynivska
- Stepne
- Tereshkivka
- Chistiy Kolodyaz
- Shatura
- Shnyakivka
- Yakhnivka

== See also ==
- List of hromadas of Ukraine
