= Losynivka =

Rural locality in Chernihiv Oblast, Ukraine

Losynivka Лосинівка
- Rural settlement
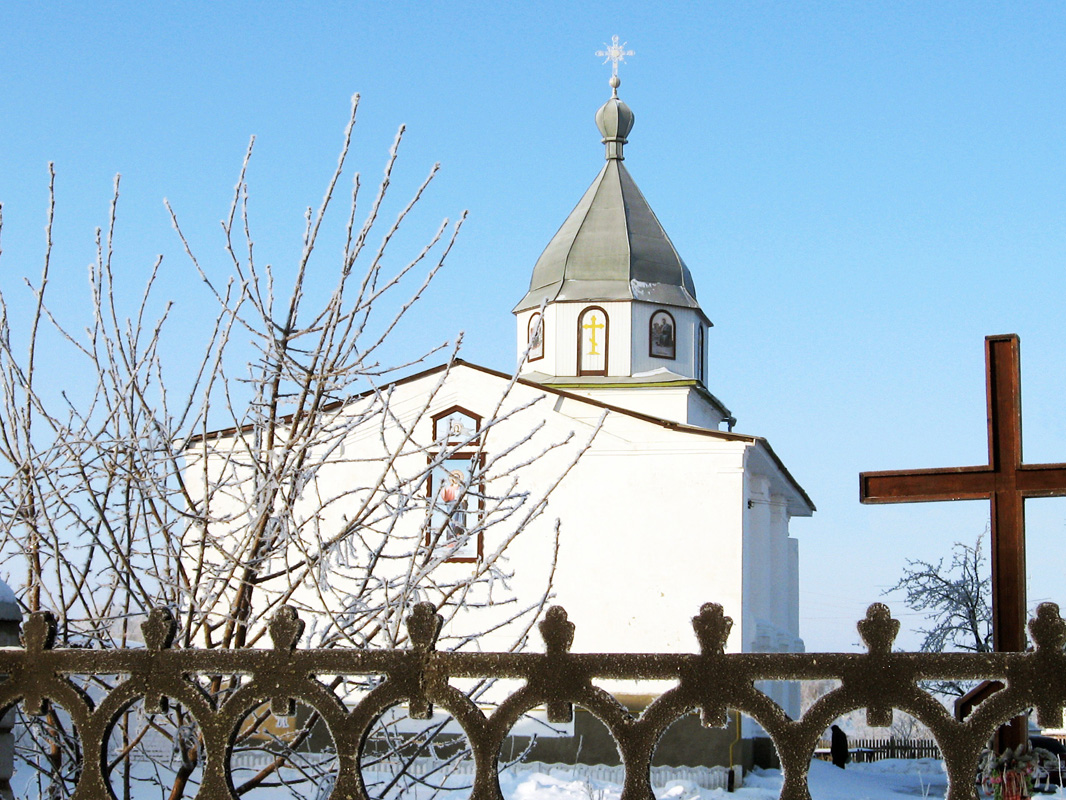

- Location within Chernihiv Oblast Location within Ukraine
- Coordinates: 50°50′36″N 31°54′50″E
- Country: Ukraine
- Oblast: Chernihiv Oblast
- Raion: Nizhyn Raion

Population (2022)
  - Total: 3,583
  - Estimate (2025): ▼3,327
- Time zone: UTC+2 (EET)
  - Summer (DST): UTC+3 (EEST)

Losynivka (Ukrainian: Лосинівка; Russian: Лосиновка) is a rural settlement in Nizhyn Raion, Chernihiv Oblast, northern Ukraine. It hosts the administration of Losynivka settlement hromada, one of the hromadas of Ukraine. Population: 3,583 (2022 estimate).

Until 26 January 2024, Losynivka was designated urban-type settlement. On this day, a new law entered into force which abolished this status, and Losynivka became a rural settlement.

== Economy ==
=== Transportation ===
Losynivka has access to the highway connecting Pryluky via Nizhyn with Highway M02.

The closest railway station, 5 kilometres (3.1 mi) northeast of the settlement, is Losynivska, on the local railway connecting Pryluky and Nizhyn.

== People ==
The singer Alla Kudlai was born in Losynivka.
