= Dmytrivka, Chernihiv Oblast =

Rural locality in Chernihiv Oblast, Ukraine

Dmytrivka Дмитрівка
- Rural settlement
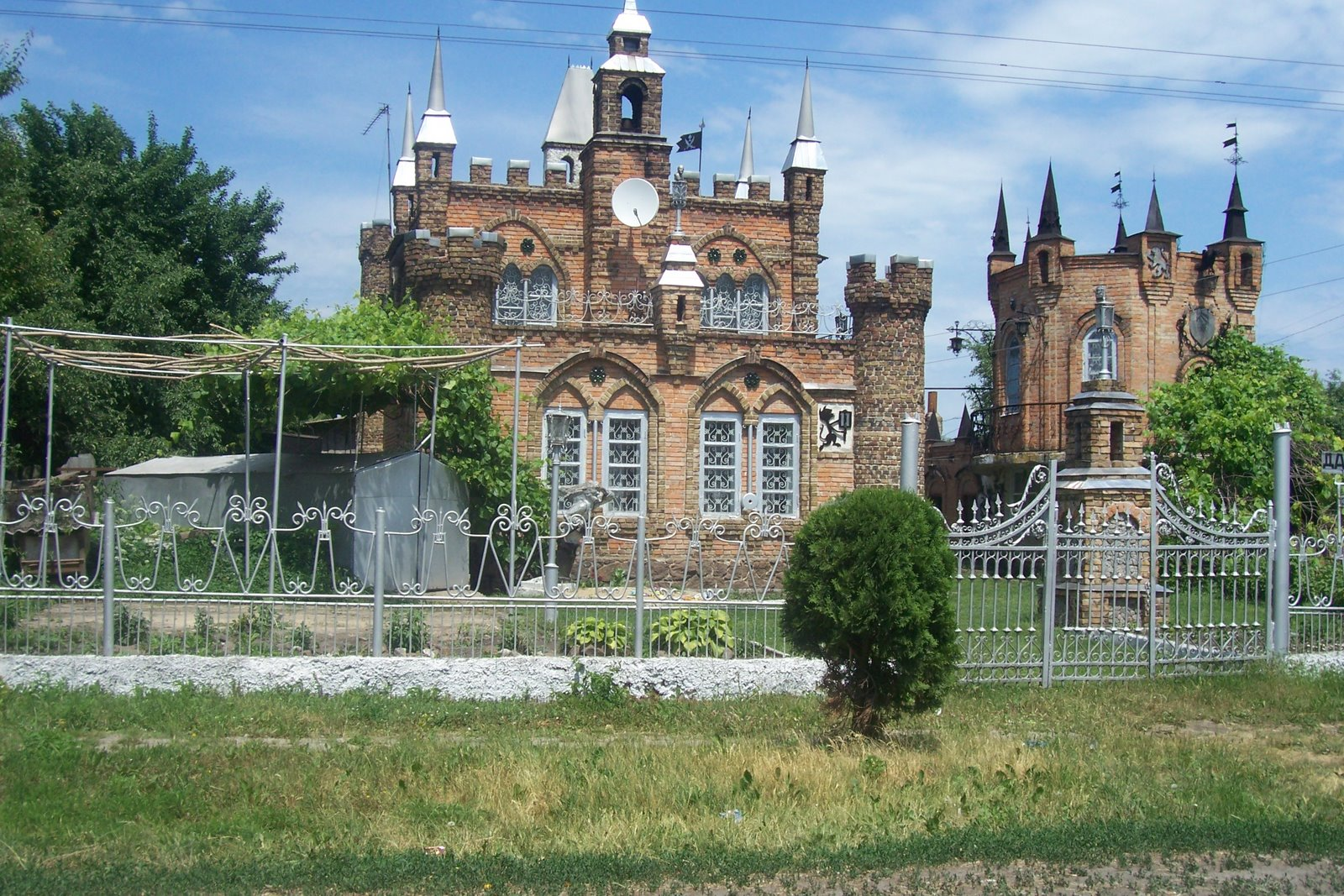

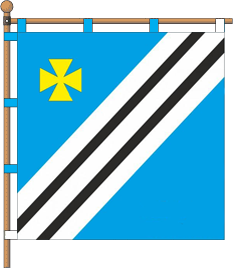
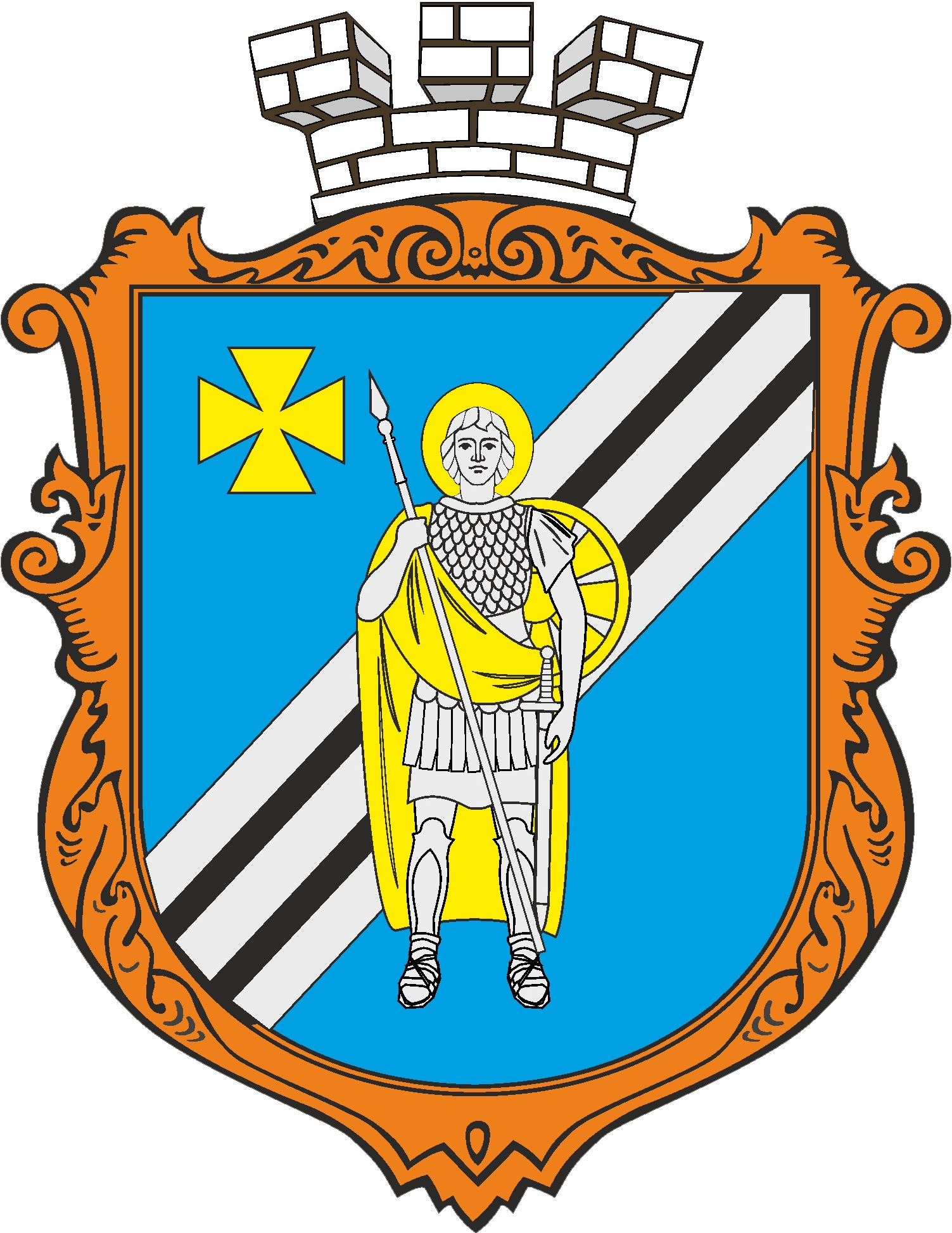
- Flag Coat of arms

- Location within Chernihiv Oblast Location within Ukraine
- Coordinates: 50°56′15″N 32°57′03″E
- Country: Ukraine
- Oblast: Chernihiv Oblast
- Raion: Nizhyn Raion

Population (2022)
  - Total: 2,090
- Time zone: UTC+2 (EET)
  - Summer (DST): UTC+3 (EEST)

Dmytrivka (Ukrainian: Дмитрівка, Russian: Дмитровка) is a rural settlement in Nizhyn Raion, Chernihiv Oblast, Ukraine. It hosts the administration of Dmytrivka settlement hromada, one of the hromadas of Ukraine. Population is 2,090 (2022 estimate).

Dmytrivka is located at the right bank of the Romen River.

== History ==
It was a settlement in the Konotopsky Uyezd of the Chernigov Governorate of the Russian Empire.

During World War II it was occupied by Axis troops from September 14, 1941, until September 14, 1943. In 1943, the German military administration operated the Dulag 102 prisoner-of-war camp in the settlement.

Dmytrivka obtained the status of urban-type settlement in 1958.

In January 1989, the population was 3929.

Until 18 July 2020, Dmytrivka belonged to Bakhmach Raion. The raion was abolished in July 2020 as part of the administrative reform of Ukraine, which reduced the number of raions of Chernihiv Oblast to five. The area of Bakhmach Raion was merged into Nizhyn Raion.

Until 26 January 2024, Dmytrivka was designated urban-type settlement. On this day, a new law entered into force which abolished this status, and Dmytrivka became a rural settlement.

== Transportation ==
A railway station is located here, on the railway connecting Bakhmach and Zavodske via Romny.

Dmytrivka is connected by roads with Bakhmach (with further access to the Highway M02), Ichnia, and Romny.
