= Bakhmach Raion =

Former subdivision of Chernihiv Oblast, Ukraine

Bahkmach Raion Бахмацький район
- Raion
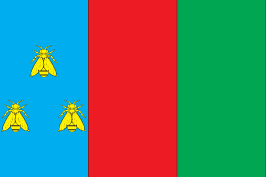
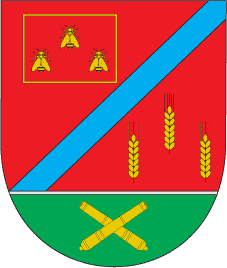
- Flag Coat of arms

- Raion location in Chernihiv Oblast
- Coordinates: 51°8′38″N 32°49′10″E
- Country: Ukraine
- Oblast: Chernihiv Oblast
- Disestablished: 18 July 2020
- Admin. center: Bakhmach

Area
  - Total: 1,487.7 km^{2} (574.4 sq mi)

Population (2020)
  - Total: 42,381
  - Density: 31.8/km^{2} (82/sq mi)
- Time zone: UTC+2 (EET)
  - Summer (DST): UTC+3 (EEST)
- Website: http://bahadm.cg.gov.ua/

Bakhmach Raion (Ukrainian: Бахмацький район) was a raion (district) of Chernihiv Oblast, within northern Ukraine. Its administrative center was located at the city of Bakhmach. The distance to the Oblast center was 153 miles (246 km) by rail and 145 miles (233 km) by highway. The raion's area was 1,487.73 square kilometres (574.42 mi^{2}). The raion was abolished on 18 July 2020 as part of the administrative reform of Ukraine, which reduced the number of raions of Chernihiv Oblast to five. The area of Bakhmach Raion was merged into Nizhyn Raion. The last estimate of the raion population was 42,381 (2020 est.)

== Subdivisions ==
At the time of disestablishment, the raion consisted of three hromadas:

- Bakhmach urban hromada with the administration in Bakhmach;
- Baturyn urban hromada with the administration in the city of Baturyn;
- Dmytrivka settlement hromada with the administration in the urban-type settlement of Dmytrivka.

== Climate ==
The climate is continental. The soils are chernozem, humus, meadow and peaty.

Minerals (nonmetallic): loam, peat bogs.

== Raion Industries ==
The main industry types within the Raion were: oil, whole milk products, conserved milk products, meat and meat products, bakery products, agriculture – grain and seed with the development of animal stock.

== Transportation ==
The roads in the raion were E101, М02 and E381.

== History ==
The origins of the Bachmach Raion date back to a time when the powerful Chernihiv principality was formed, the borders of which were stretched away beyond Klyazma.

== Politics ==
On May 25, 2014 when presidential elections took place in Ukraine 46 polling stations were created within the Bakhmach Raion with election turnout at 63.09% (23,428 votes from 37,137 voters). The largest number of votes received: Poroshenko – 38.54% (9030 voters); Oleg Lyashko – 25.16% (5894 voters), Yulia Tymoshenko – 21.97% (5147 voters), Anatoliy Gritsenko – 5,74% (1345 voters). The rest of the candidates gained fewer votes. Number of invalid ballots spoiled or – 1.05%. [1]

== Famous people from Bakhmach Raion ==
- Petro Prokopovych was the founder of world's commercial beekeeping who practiced, researched and taught in the local villages of Mytchenky and Palchyky.

== Settlements ==
- 1. Baturyn – City
- 2. Bakhmach – City
- 3. Dmytrivka – urban-type settlement
- 4. Shchucha Hreblya – Village
- 5. Bakhmach – Village
- 6. Koshmaliv – Village
- 7. Ostriv – Village
- 8. Pashkiv – Village
- 9. Bilovezhi Pershi – Village
- 10. Bilovezhi Druhi – Village
- 11. Vyshnivske – Village
- 12. Zarukavne – Village
- 13. Zelenivka – Village
- 14. Kal'chynivka – Village
- 15. Haivoron – Village
- 16. Vos'me Bereznya – Village
- 17. Zalissia – Village
- 18. Nechaiv – Village
- 19. Shevchenkove – Village
- 20. Holinka – Village
- 21. Chasnykivka – Village
- 22. Shumyn – Village
- 23. Hryhorivka – Village
- 24. Vesele – Township
- 25. Krasylivka – Village
- 26. Cheremushky – Township
- 27. Peremoha – Township
- 28. Karpenkove – Township
- 29. Pyrohivka – Village
- 30. Tasuiv – Village
- 31. Kropyvne – Village
- 32. Kurin – Village
- 33. Opolons'ke – Village
- 34. Shumeikiv – Village
- 35. Matiivka – Village
- 36. Bondari – Village
- 37. Veselivka – Village
- 38. Holubiv – Township
- 39. Katsiry – Township
- 40. Lisova Polyana – Village
- 41. Lopatyn – Township
- 42. Mosty – Village
- 43. Nove Polissya – Village
- 44. Shumeikyne – Village
- 45. Mytchenky – Village
- 46. Obmachiv – Village
- 47. Verbivka – Village
- 48. Osich – Village
- 49. Slobidka – Village
- 50. Pal'chyky – Village
- 51. Pisky – Village
- 52. Varvarivka – Village
- 53. Zaporiz'ke – Village
- 54. Kulishove – Village
- 55. Oleksiivka – Village
- 56. Osynivka – Village
- 57. Rubanka – Village
- 58. Zabolottya – Village
- 59. Koval'ove – Village
- 60. Smolove – Village
- 61. Tereshykha – Village
- 62. Stril'nyky – Village
- 63. Tynytsya – Village
- 64. Fastivtsi – Village
- 65. Bezpechne – Village
- 66. Vyshneve – Village
- 67. Hrushivka – Village
- 68. Pershe Travnia – Village
- 69. Khalymonove – Village
- 70. Vyshneve – Village
- 71. Hlyboke – Village
- 72. Movchyniv – Village

*This is not a complete list of settlements, and needs revision especially during 'Decentralization'(Dec 2016).
