= Nosivka =

Town in Chernihiv Oblast, Ukraine

Nosivka Носівка Носовка
- City
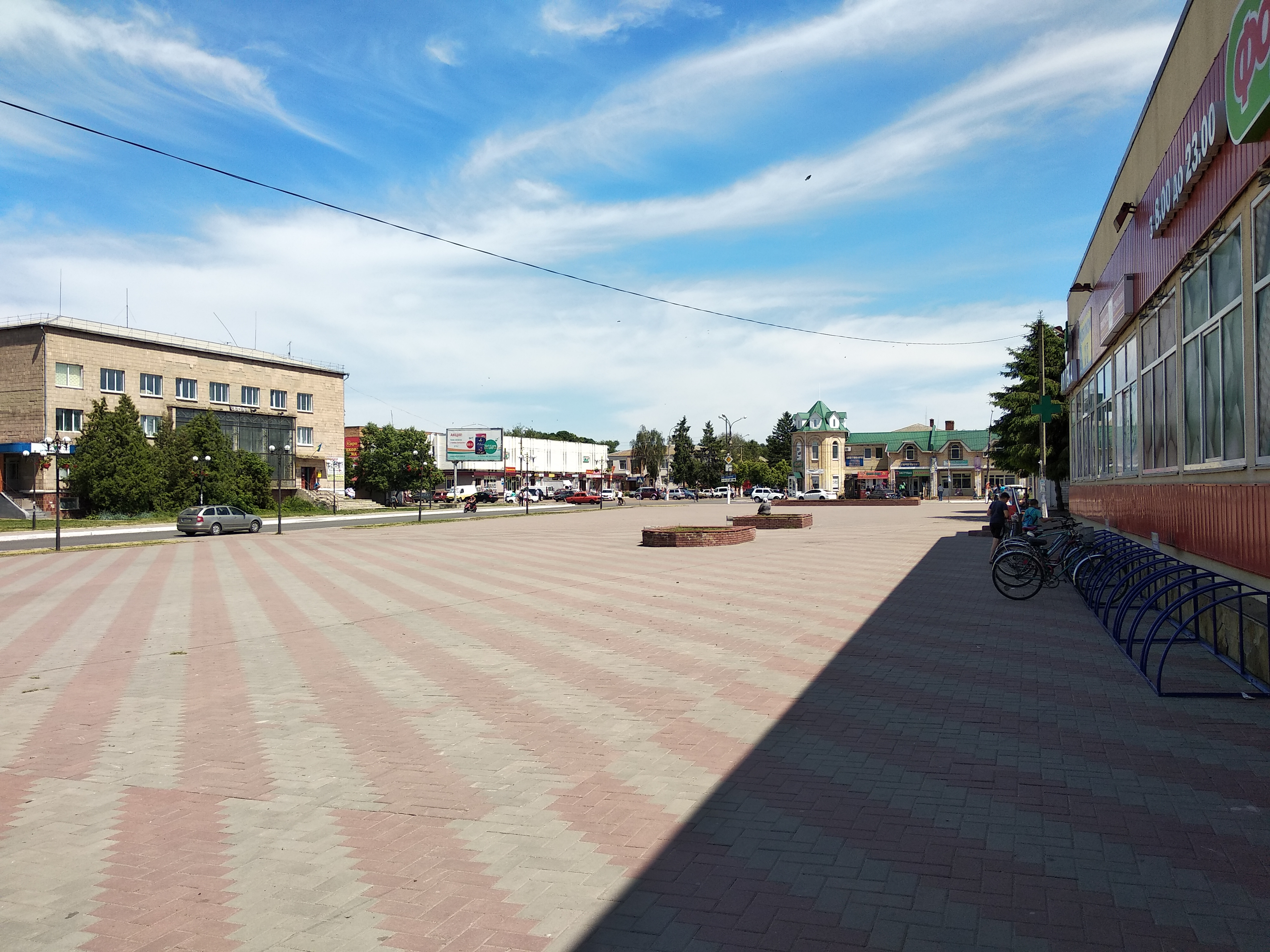
- Town center

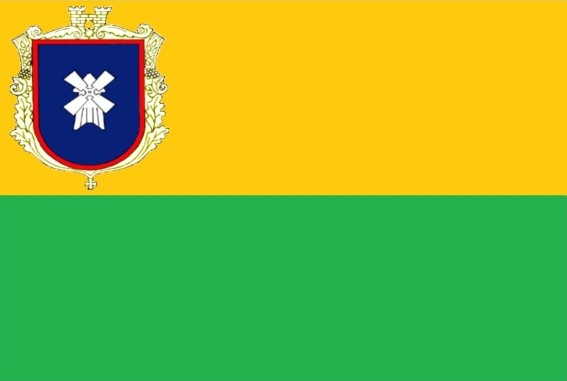
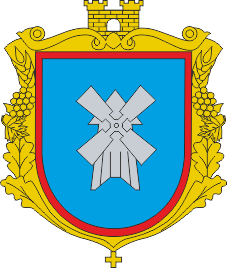
- Flag Coat of arms

- Location of Nosivka in Chernihiv Oblast Nosivka (Ukraine)
- Coordinates: 50°55′48″N 31°34′50″E
- Country: Ukraine
- Oblast: Chernihiv Oblast
- Raion: Nizhyn Raion
- Hromada: Nosivka urban hromada
- First mentioned: 1147

Area
  - Total: 2,685 km^{2} (1,037 sq mi)

Population (2025)
  - Total: 13,978

Nosivka (Ukrainian: Носівка, pronounced [ˈnɔs⁽ʲ⁾iu̯kɐ]) is a city in Nizhyn Raion, Chernihiv Oblast (province) of Ukraine. It hosts the administration of Nosivka urban hromada, one of the hromadas of Ukraine. Population: 12,908 (2022 estimate).

== History ==
Under the Cossack Hetmanate Nosivka served as a sotnia town. In 1802 it was incorporated into Nizhyn povit as a volost town. In 1897 its population reached 15,000 inhabitants, growing to 25,200 in 1966.

Until 18 July 2020, Nosivka was the administrative center of Nosivka Raion. The raion was abolished in July 2020 as part of the administrative reform of Ukraine, which reduced the number of raions of Chernihiv Oblast to five. The area of Nosivka Raion was merged into Nizhyn Raion.

== Economy ==
Nosivka has long been a centre of food industry and hosted a sugar refinery. An agricultural selectionary station operated in the surrounding district.

== Notable people ==
- Roman Rudenko, Soviet lawyer, a chief prosecutor for the USSR at the Nuremberg trials.
- Victoria Spartz, US politician in Indiana

== Gallery ==
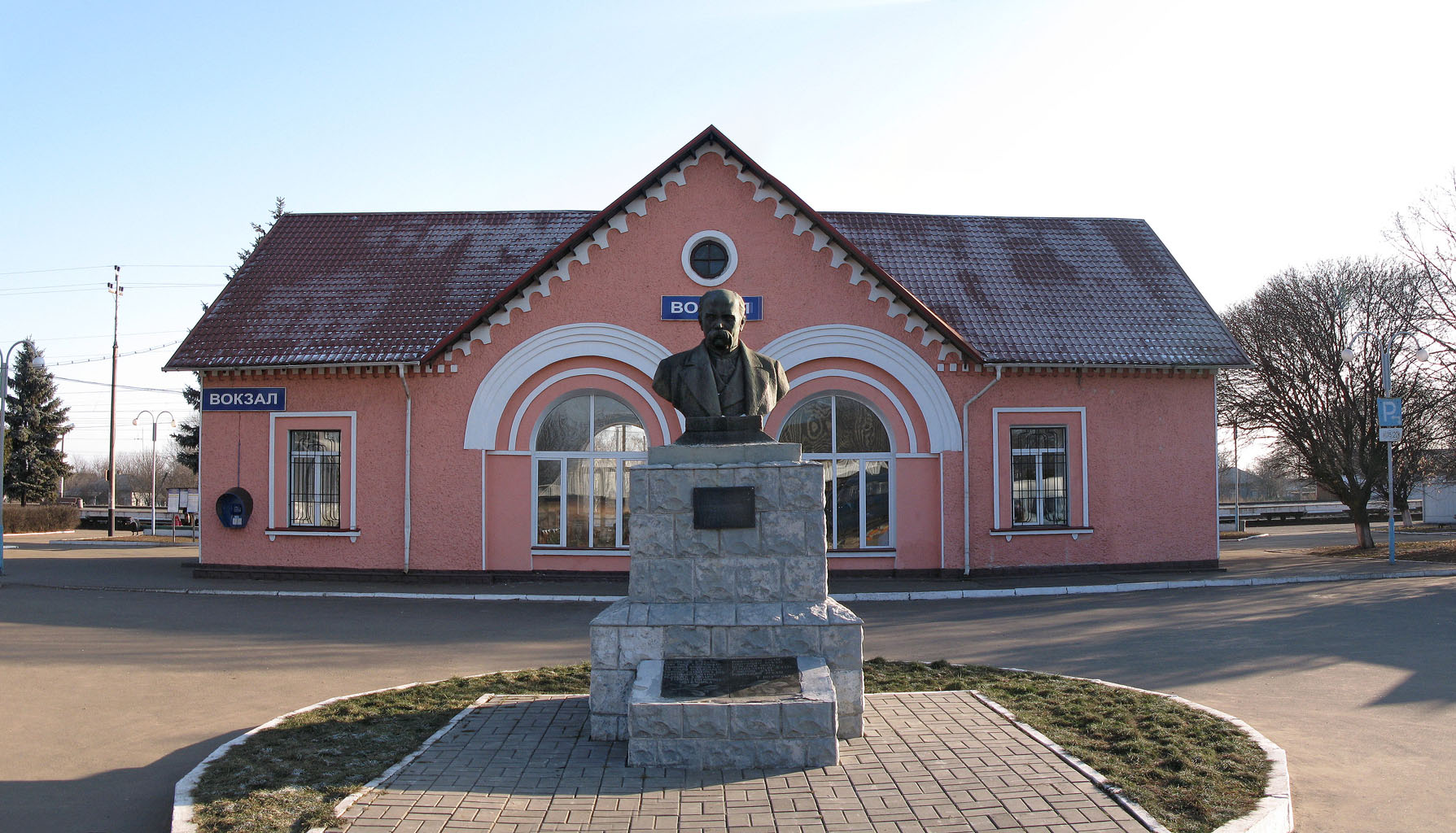
Nosivka railway station

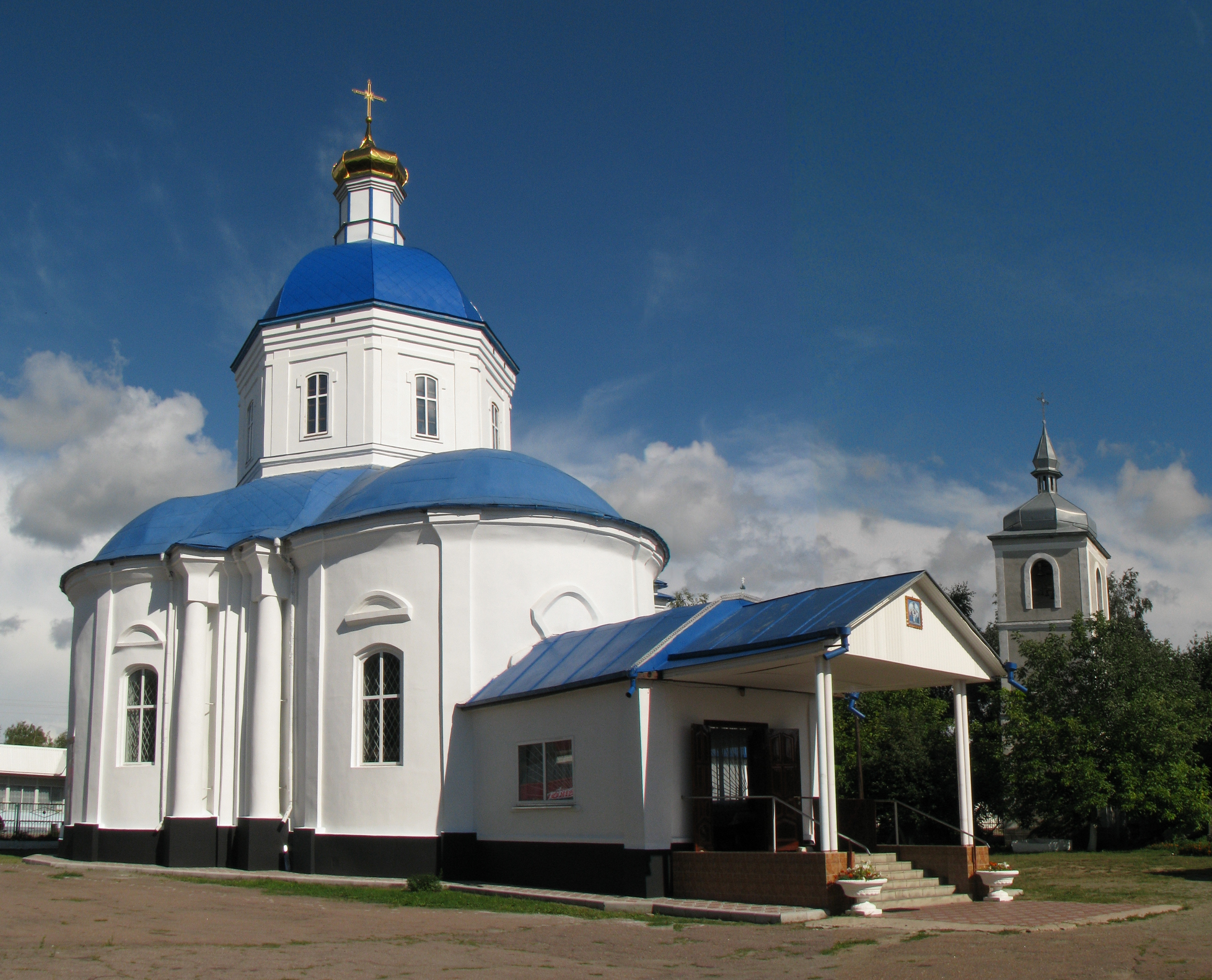
Trinity Church

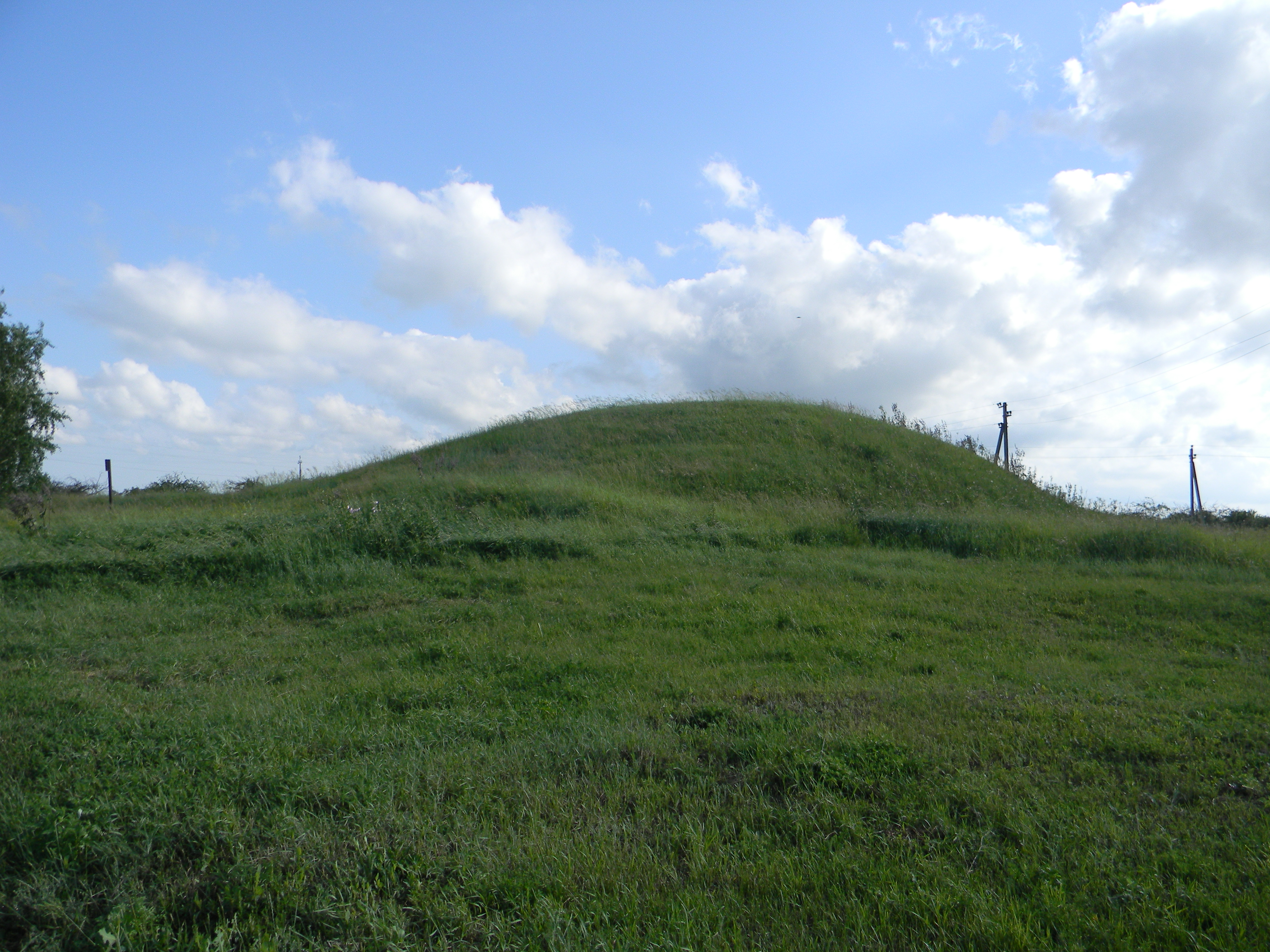
Shaulyna Mohyla mound in Nosivka
