= Stepan Bulba =

Ukrainian politician

- Степан Степанович Бульба
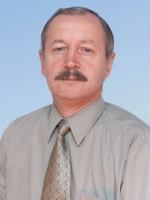
- Official portrait of Bulba

People's Deputy of Ukraine
- In office 2002 – 19 May 2005
- In office 25 May 2006 – 23 November 2007

Governor of Poltava Oblast
- In office 19 May 2005 2005 – 23 May 2006

Personal details
- Born: 19 July 1950 Ombysh, Chernihiv Oblast, Ukrainian SSR, Soviet Union
- Party: CPSU (1974-1991); Socialist Party of Ukraine (1995-present)
- Education: Military Institute of Engineering Troops of the Combined Arms Academy named after Kuybyshev

Stepan Bulba (Ukrainian: Степан Степанович Бульба; born 19 July 1950) is a Ukrainian politician and military scientist. After initially working as a military scientist and teacher for a military school and then a pedagogical university in Poltava, he entered the Verkhovna Rada as a member of the Socialist Party of Ukraine in 2002. He served in this position until 2007, in conjunction with serving as the Governor of Poltava Oblast from 2005 to 2006.

== Early life ==
Bulba was born on 19 July 1950 in the village of Ombysh, which was located in the Chernihiv Oblast of the Ukrainian SSR at the time of his birth. In 1978, he graduated from the Military Institute of Engineering Troops of the Combined Arms Academy named after Kuybyshev with a degree in military geodesic engineering. After graduating, he worked as a teacher and military scientist at the Department of Tactics of the Poltava Higher Anti-Aircraft Missile Command Red Banner School named after General of the Army M. F. Vatutin.

In March 1991, he was elected secretary of the party committee of the Poltava school, which the rights of a district-level committee, until this role was terminated following the banning of political parties within the Soviet Army. From September 1991 to October 1992, he served as Chairman of the Officers' Assembly of the school. In October 1992, after Ukraine's independence and te size of the military was downsived, he was released into the reserve military with the rank of colonel. Afterwards, he started teaching until 2001 at the Poltava V.G. Korolenko National Pedagogical University as a senior lecturer in special historical disciplines and geography.

== Political career ==
From February 2005 to May 2006 - Head of Poltava Regional State Administration.

2006-2007 - Member of the Parliament of Ukraine of the V convocation, Chairman of the Subcommittee of the Committee on National Security and Defense, member of the Permanent Parliamentary Delegation of Ukraine to the NATO Parliamentary Assembly.

Member of the Socialist Party of Ukraine since March 1995. First Secretary of the Poltava Regional Committee of the SPU.

Active participant of the All-Ukrainian protest actions “Ukraine without Kuchma!”, “Arise, Ukraine!”. He was repeatedly brought to court for organizing mass rallies and pickets in Poltava during the presidency of Leonid Kuchma. During the events of the fall of 2004 and winter of 2005, Stepan Bulba headed the Poltava regional headquarters of the National Rescue Committee.

2010 - candidate for mayor of Poltava from the Socialist Party of Ukraine.
