= Panteleimon Kulish Gymnasium =

Gymnasium named after Panteleimon Kulish

Location
- Bogdan Shmelnytsky,1; Borzna, Chernihiv Oblast, 16400; Ukraine
- Coordinates: 51.25385°N 32.43453°E

Information
- Type: Public gymnasium
- Established: 1912
- Principal: Anna Ryaboshtanova
- Classes: 13

The Borzna Panteleimon Kulish Gymnasium (Ukrainian: Борзнянська гімназія імені Пантелеймона Куліша, romanized: Borznianska himnaziia imeni Panteleimona Kulisha) is a public gymnasium school in Borzna, Chernihiv Oblast, Ukraine, founded in 1912.

== Sources ==
- Ukrainian publishing center "Galaxy-s"
- Gymnasium named Panteleimon Kulish Borzna Borznyansky City District Council of Chernihiv region
- Ukrainian legal portal
- Gymnasium named Panteleimon Kulish Borzna Borznyansky City District Council of Chernihiv region
- About naming Panteleimon Kulish Gymnasium Borzna
