= Talalaivka rural hromada =

Talalaivka rural hromada Талалаївська сільська громада
- Hromada
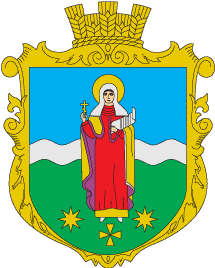
- Coat of arms
- Interactive map of Talalaivka rural hromada
- Country: Ukraine
- Oblast: Chernihiv
- Raion: Nizhyn

Area
  - Total: 249.6 km^{2} (96.4 sq mi)

Population (2020)
  - Total: 4,711
  - Density: 18.87/km^{2} (48.88/sq mi)
- CATOTTG code: UA74040330000024949
- Settlements: 15
- Villages: 15
- Website: talalaivka-gromada.gov.ua

Talalaivka rural hromada (Ukrainian: Талалаївська сільська громада) is a hromada of Ukraine, located in Nizhyn Raion, Chernihiv Oblast. Its administrative center is the village of Talalaivka.

It has an area of 249.6 square kilometres (96.4 mi^{2}) and a population of 4,711, as of 2020.

== Composition ==
The hromada contains 15 settlements, which are all villages:

- Bezuhlivka
- Bidyn
- Velika Doroha
- Dovhe
- Kalynivka
- Kravchiha
- Kropyvne
- Kurylivka
- Lustivka
- Nizhynske
- Pashkivka
- Sindarevske
- Talalaivka
- Khvylivka
- Khomyvka

== See also ==
- List of hromadas of Ukraine
