= Plysky rural hromada =

Plysky rural hromada Плисківська сільська громада
- Hromada
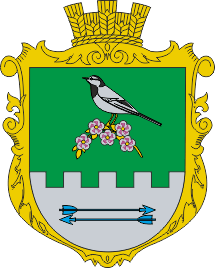
- Coat of arms
- Interactive map of Plysky rural hromada
- Country: Ukraine
- Oblast: Chernihiv
- Raion: Nizhyn

Area
  - Total: 235.9 km^{2} (91.1 sq mi)

Population (2020)
  - Total: 2,652
  - Density: 11.24/km^{2} (29.12/sq mi)
- CATOTTG code: UA74040310000039217
- Settlements: 5
- Villages: 5
- Website: plyskivska.gromada.org.ua

Plysky rural hromada (Ukrainian: Плисківська сільська громада) is a hromada of Ukraine, located in Nizhyn Raion, Chernihiv Oblast. Its administrative center is the village of Plysky.

It has an area of 235.9 square kilometres (91.1 mi^{2}) and a population of 2,652, as of 2020.

== Composition ==
The hromada contains 5 settlements, which are all villages:

- Velika Zahorivka
- Makhnivka
- Plysky
- Sivolozh
- Stepne

== See also ==
- List of hromadas of Ukraine
