= Mryn rural hromada =

Mryn rural hromada Мринська сільська громада
- Hromada
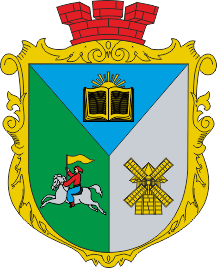
- Coat of arms
- Interactive map of Mryn rural hromada
- Country: Ukraine
- Oblast: Chernihiv
- Raion: Nizhyn

Area
  - Total: 332.0 km^{2} (128.2 sq mi)

Population (2020)
  - Total: 4,062
  - Density: 12.23/km^{2} (31.69/sq mi)
- CATOTTG code: UA74040230000022565
- Settlements: 15
- Villages: 15
- Website: mrynska.gromada.org.ua

Mryn rural hromada (Ukrainian: Мринська сільська громада) is a hromada of Ukraine, located in Nizhyn Raion, Chernihiv Oblast. Its administrative center is the village of Mryn.

It has an area of 332.0 square kilometres (128.2 mi^{2}) and a population of 4,062, as of 2020.

It was formed on August 4, 2016, through the merger of Lykhachivska, Mrynska, Ploskivska, Selyshchenska, and Khotynivska village councils of Nizhyn district.

== Composition ==
The hromada contains 7 settlements, which are all villages:

- Kiselyvka
- Lykhachiv
- Mryn
- Ploske
- Rozdolne
- Selishche
- Khotynivka

== See also ==
- List of hromadas of Ukraine
