= Plysky =

Plysky Плиски
- Village
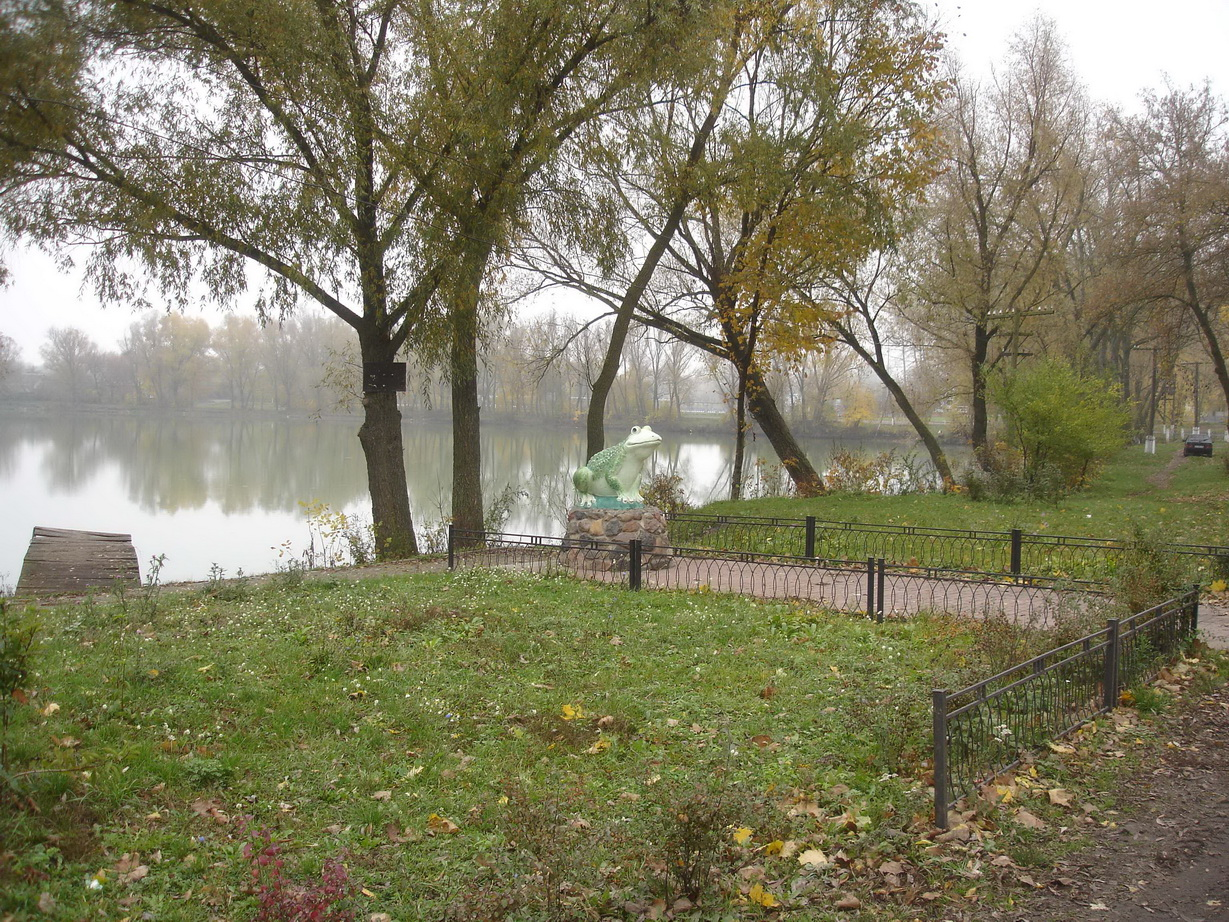
- Park in Plysky with a pond

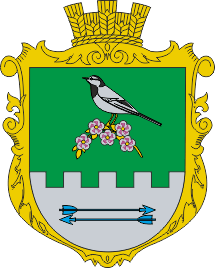
- Coat of arms

- Location in Ukraine Plysky (Chernihiv Oblast)
- Coordinates: 51°06′N 32°25′E
- Country: Ukraine
- Oblast: Chernihiv Oblast
- Raion: Nizhyn Raion
- Village founded: 17th century

Area
  - Total: 3.0 km^{2} (1.2 sq mi)
- Elevation: 137 m (449 ft)

Population (2022)
  - Total: 900
  - Density: 444.333/km^{2} (1,150.82/sq mi)
- Time zone: UTC+2 (EET)
  - Summer (DST): UTC+3 (EEST)
- Postal code: 16453
- Area code: +380 4653

Plysky (Ukrainian: Плиски) is a village in Nizhyn Raion, Chernihiv Oblast, Ukraine. It hosts the administration of Plysky rural hromada, one of the hromadas of Ukraine. The village has a population of 900.

American biologist Alexander Petrunkevitch was born in Plysky.

Until 18 July 2020, Plysky belonged to Borzna Raion. The raion was abolished in July 2020 as part of the administrative reform of Ukraine, which reduced the number of raions of Chernihiv Oblast to five. The area of Borzna Raion was merged into Nizhyn Raion.
