= Dmytrivka settlement hromada =

Dmytrivka settlement hromada Дмитрівська селищна громада
- Hromada
- Interactive map of Dmytrivka settlement hromada
- Country: Ukraine
- Oblast: Chernihiv
- Raion: Nizhyn

Area
  - Total: 327.1 km^{2} (126.3 sq mi)

Population (2020)
  - Total: 5,067
  - Density: 15.49/km^{2} (40.12/sq mi)
- CATOTTG code: UA74040130000094076
- Settlements: 15
- Rural settlements: 2
- Villages: 13
- Website: dmytrivska-gromada.gov.ua

Dmytrivka settlement hromada (Ukrainian: Дмитрівська селищна громада) is a hromada of Ukraine, located in Nizhyn Raion, Chernihiv Oblast. Its administrative centre is the rural settlement of Dmytrivka.

It has an area of 327.1 square kilometres (126.3 mi^{2}) and a population of 5,067, as of 2020.

== Composition ==
The hromada includes 15 settlements: 2 rural settlements (Dmytrivka and Nove) and 13 villages:

- Haivoron
- Holinka
- Kovalove
- Kropyvne
- Nechaiv
- Rubanka
- Shchucha Hreblia
- Shevchenkove
- Smolove
- Tereshykha
- Vosme Bereznia
- Zabolottia
- Zalissia

== See also ==
- List of hromadas of Ukraine
