= Kruty, Chernihiv Oblast =

Village in Nizhyn Raion, Chernihiv Oblast

Kruty
- Village
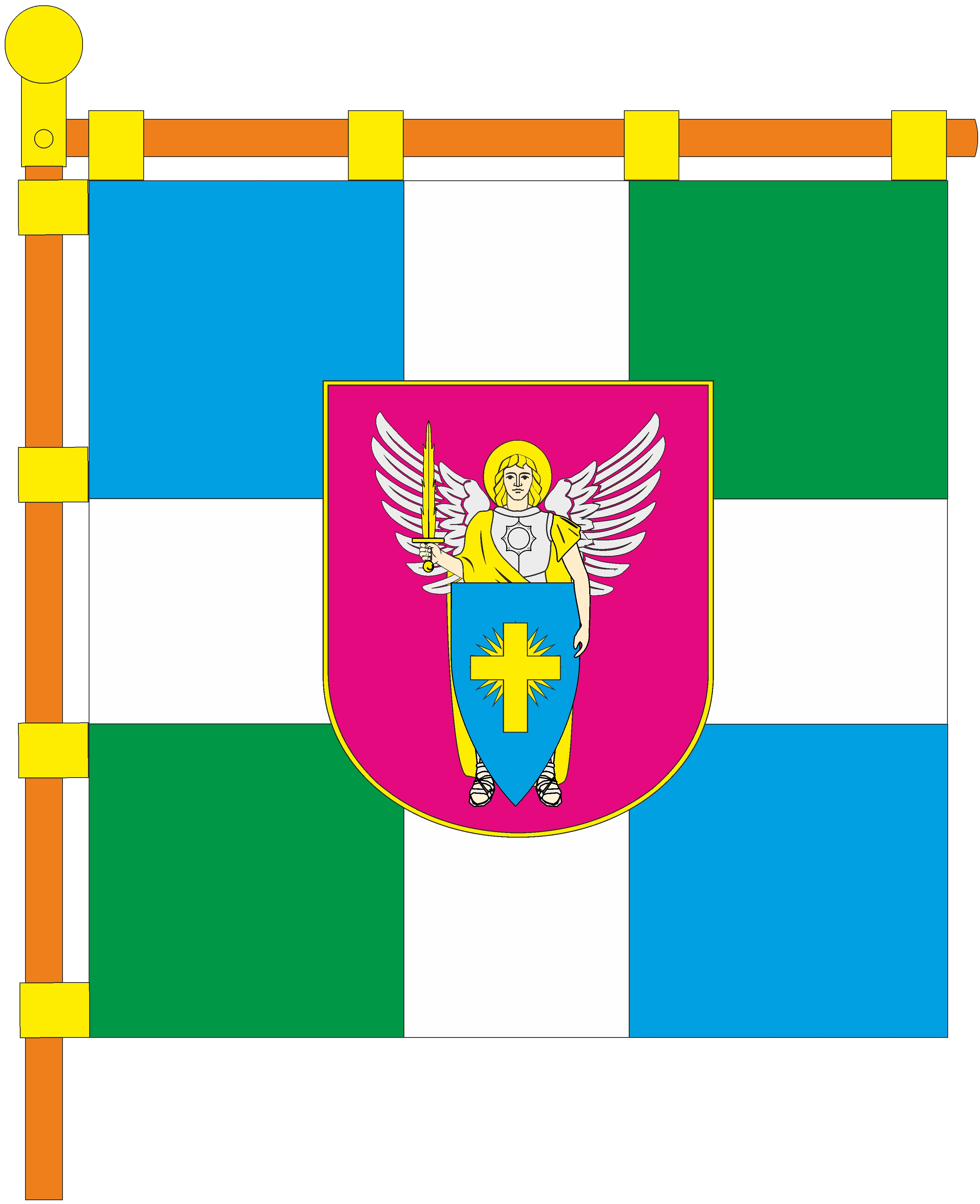
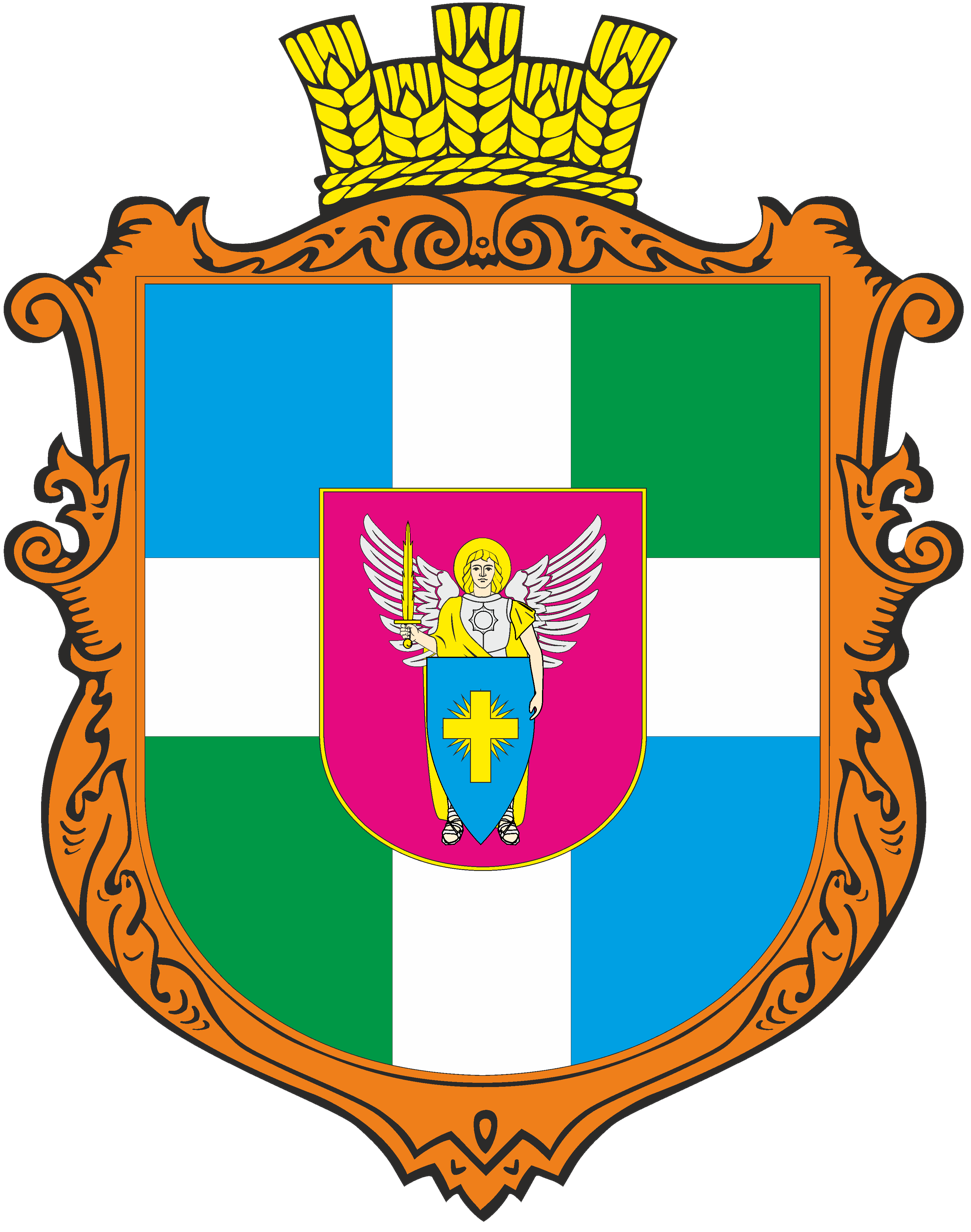
- Flag Coat of arms
- Interactive map of Kruty
- Location within Chernihiv Oblast Location within Ukraine
- Country: Ukraine
- Oblast: Chernihiv Oblast
- Raion: Nizhyn Raion
- Hromada: Kruty rural hromada
- Founded: 1500

Area
  - Total: 339 km^{2} (131 sq mi)
- Elevation: 127 m (417 ft)

Population
  - Total: 1,330
  - Density: 39,233/km^{2} (101,610/sq mi)
- Postal code: 16645

Kruty (Ukrainian: Крути) is a village in Ukraine, located in Nizhyn Raion, Chernihiv Oblast. It is the administrative center of Kruty rural hromada, one of the hromadas of Ukraine.

It was the site of the Battle of Kruty during the Ukrainian–Soviet War.
