= Kruty rural hromada =

Kruty rural hromada Крутівська сільська громада
- Hromada
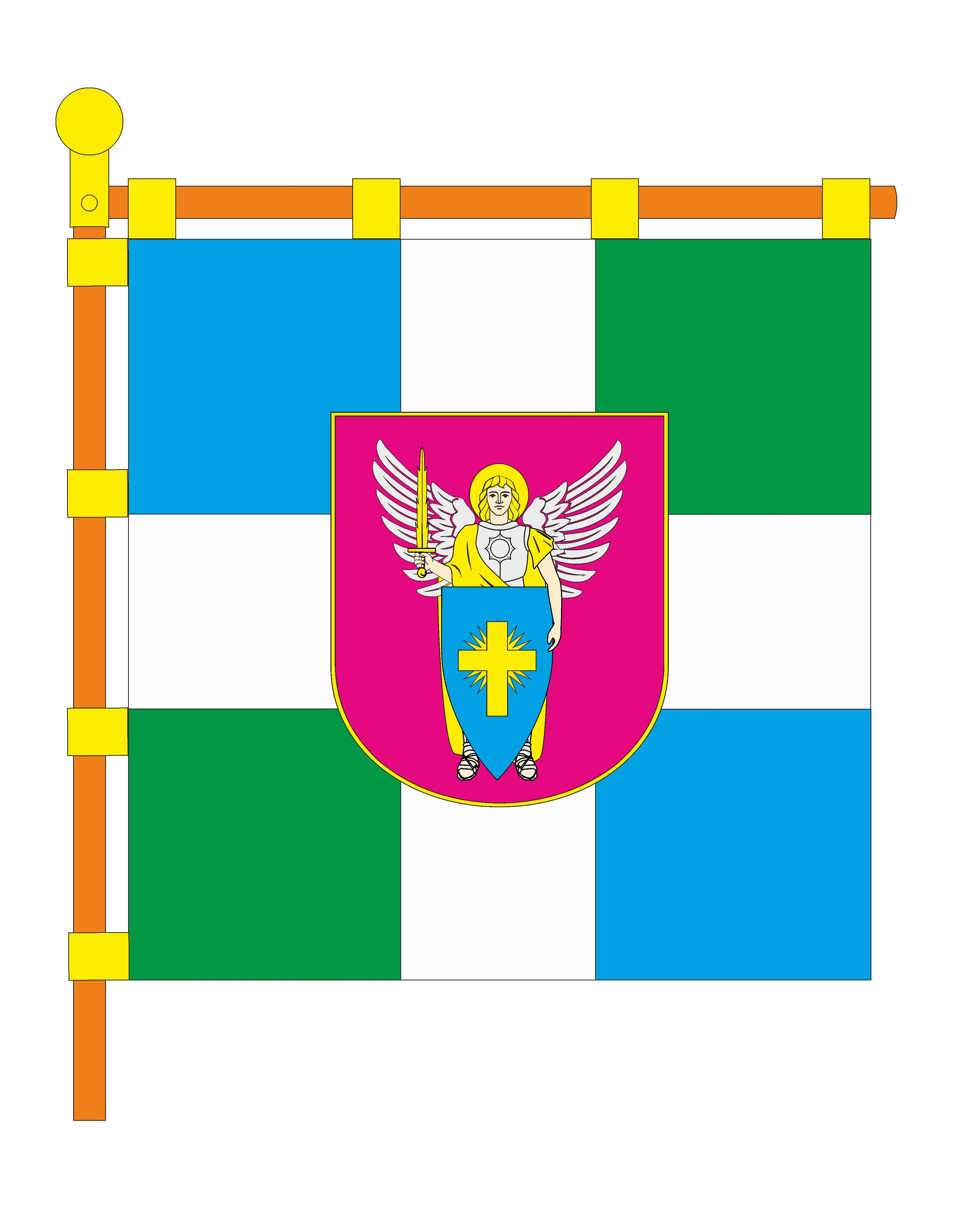
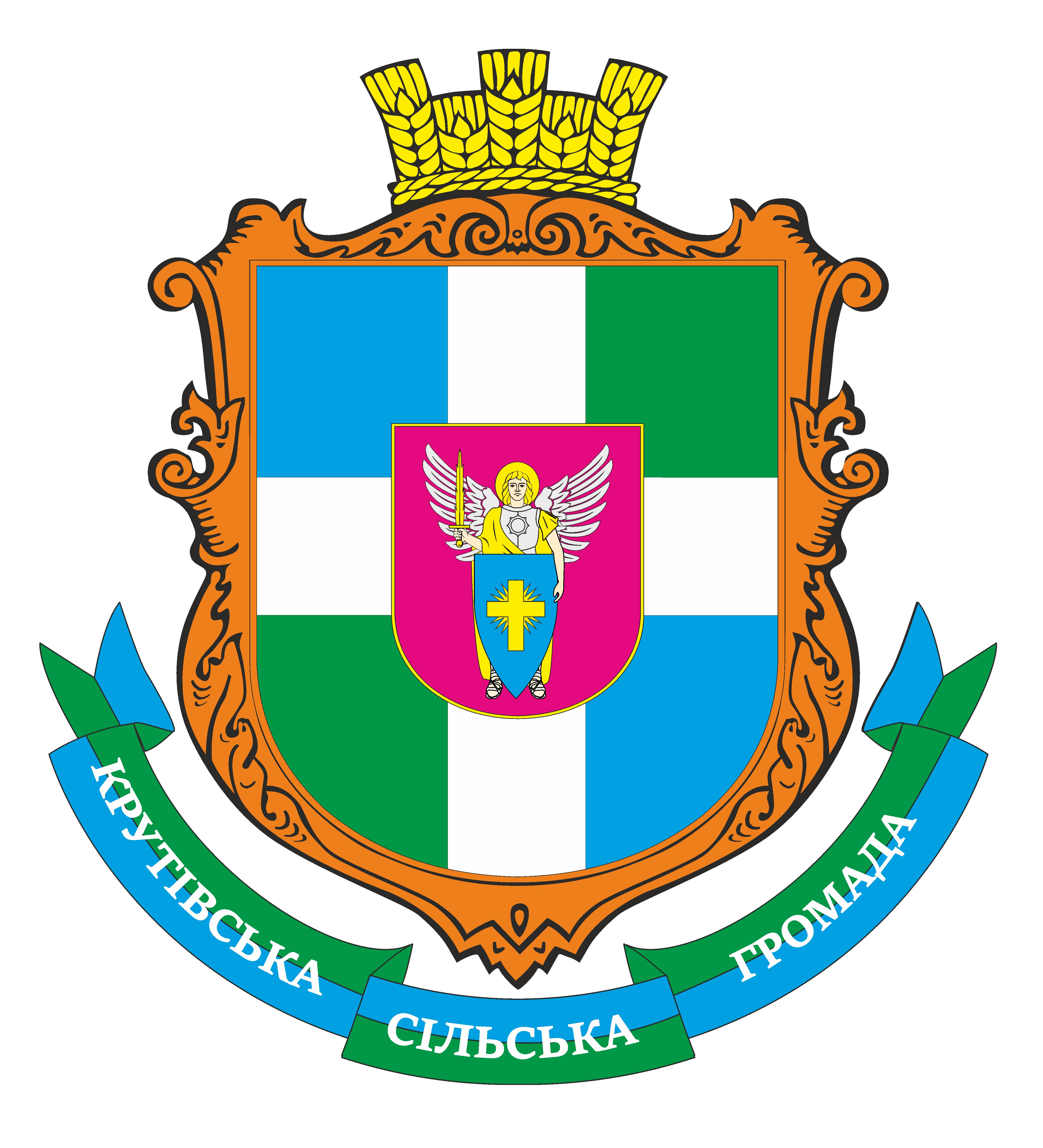
- Flag Coat of arms
- Interactive map of Kruty rural hromada
- Country: Ukraine
- Oblast: Chernihiv Oblast
- Raion: Nizhyn Raion

Area
  - Total: 285.4 km^{2} (110.2 sq mi)

Population (2020)
  - Total: 3,560
  - Density: 12.5/km^{2} (32.3/sq mi)
- CATOTTG code: UA74040170000037628
- Settlements: 14
- Villages: 14

Kruty rural hromada (Ukrainian: Крутівська сільська громада) is a hromada of Ukraine, located in Nizhyn Raion, Chernihiv Oblast. Its administrative center is the village of Kruty.

It has an area of 285.4 square kilometres (110.2 mi^{2}) and a population of 3,560, as of 2020.

== Composition ==
The hromada contains 14 settlements, which are all villages:

- Baklanove
- Burkivka
- Valentiiv
- Dibrova
- Kruty
- Ombysh
- Oster
- Pamiatne
- Perebudova
- Pechi
- Poliana
- Pochechyne
- Ukrainka
- Khoroshe Ozero

== See also ==
- List of hromadas of Ukraine
