= Borzna urban hromada =

Borzna urban hromada Борзнянська міська громада
- Hromada
- Coat of arms
- Interactive map of Borzna urban hromada
- Country: Ukraine
- Oblast: Chernihiv
- Raion: Nizhyn

Area
  - Total: 538.1 km^{2} (207.8 sq mi)

Population (2025)
  - Total: 16,352
  - Density: 30.39/km^{2} (78.71/sq mi)
- CATOTTG code: UA74040070000086652
- Settlements: 22
- Cities: 1
- Villages: 21
- Website: borznyanska-gromada.gov.ua

Borzna urban hromada (Ukrainian: Борзнянська міська громада) is a hromada of Ukraine, located in Nizhyn Raion, Chernihiv Oblast. Its administrative center is the city of Borzna.

It has an area of 538.1 square kilometres (207.8 mi^{2}) and a population of 16,352, as of 2025.

== Composition ==
The hromada contains 22 settlements: 1 city (Borzna) and 21 villages:

- Adamivka
- Volnytsia
- Hryshivka
- Zhdaniv
- Zabilivshchyna
- Zabilivshchyna Druha
- Ivanivka
- Kinashivka
- Krasnostav
- Lyubomudrivka
- Mala Zahorivka
- Mykolaivka
- Olenivka
- Ostriv Nadiyi
- Prachi
- Saponivka
- Sukhovodka
- Chervone Ozero
- Shapovalivka
- Yurkivshchyna
- Yaduty

== See also ==
- List of hromadas of Ukraine
