= Vysoke rural hromada =

Vysoke rural hromada Височанська сільська громада
- Hromada
- Interactive map of Vysoke rural hromada
- Country: Ukraine
- Oblast: Chernihiv
- Raion: Nizhyn

Area
  - Total: 267.4 km^{2} (103.2 sq mi)

Population (2020)
  - Total: 4,281
  - Density: 16.01/km^{2} (41.46/sq mi)
- CATOTTG code: UA74040110000021989
- Settlements: 15
- Rural settlements: 1
- Villages: 14
- Website: vysochanska.gromada.org.ua

Vysoke rural hromada (Ukrainian: Височанська сільська громада) is a hromada of Ukraine, located in Nizhyn Raion, Chernihiv Oblast. Its administrative center is the village of Vysoke.

It has an area of 267.4 square kilometres (103.2 mi^{2}) and a population of 4,281, as of 2020.

== Composition ==
The hromada contains 15 settlements, with 14 villages:

- Chervona Hirka
- Dobropillia
- Halaibyne
- Holovenky
- Kerbutivka
- Kupchenkiv
- Mala Doch
- Malychyna Hreblia
- Noselivka
- Novi Mlyny
- Parystivka
- Trostianka
- Velyka Doch
- Vysoke

And 1 rural settlement: Klypyn.

== See also ==
- List of hromadas of Ukraine
