= Makiivka rural hromada =

Makiivka rural hromada Макіївська сільська громада
- Hromada
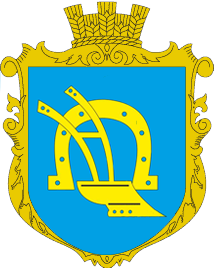
- Coat of arms
- Interactive map of Makiivka rural hromada
- Country: Ukraine
- Oblast: Chernihiv
- Raion: Nizhyn

Area
  - Total: 248.1 km^{2} (95.8 sq mi)

Population (2020)
  - Total: 3,545
  - Density: 14.29/km^{2} (37.01/sq mi)
- CATOTTG code: UA74040210000018988
- Settlements: 19
- Villages: 19
- Website: makiivska.gromada.org.ua

Makiivka rural hromada (Ukrainian: Макіївська сільська громада) is a hromada of Ukraine, located in Nizhyn Raion, Chernihiv Oblast. Its administrative center is the village of Makiivka.

It has an area of 248.1 square kilometres (95.8 mi^{2}) and a population of 3,545, as of 2020.

== Composition ==
The hromada contains 19 settlements, which are all villages:

- Verbove
- Vesele
- Vyla
- Vyshneve
- Vidradne
- Hannivka
- Hryhorivka
- Kalynivka
- Karabynivka
- Klenove
- Kolomiytsivka
- Makiivka
- Mylnyky
- Platonovka
- Pustotine
- Rivchak-Stepanivka
- Sofiivka
- Stepove
- Stepovi Khutory

== See also ==
- List of hromadas of Ukraine
