= Nosivka urban hromada =

Nosivka urban hromada Носівська міська громада
- Hromada
- Interactive map of Nosivka urban hromada
- Country: Ukraine
- Oblast: Chernihiv
- Raion: Nizhyn

Area
  - Total: 569.8 km^{2} (220.0 sq mi)

Population (2020)
  - Total: 19,575
  - Density: 34.35/km^{2} (88.98/sq mi)
- CATOTTG code: UA74040290000072674
- Settlements: 21
- Cities: 1
- Villages: 20
- Website: nosgromada.cg.gov.ua

Nosivka urban hromada (Ukrainian: Носівська міська громада) is a hromada of Ukraine, located in Nizhyn Raion, Chernihiv Oblast. Its administrative center is the city of Nosivka.

It has an area of 569.8 square kilometres (220.0 mi^{2}) and a population of 19,575, as of 2020.

== Composition ==
The hromada contains 21 settlements: 1 city (Nosivka) and 20 villages:

- Adamivka
- Andriivka
- Vedmedivka
- Volodkova Divitsia
- Debreve
- Derzhanivka
- Doslidne
- Irzhavets
- Kobyleschyna
- Kozary
- Korobchyne
- Krynytsia
- Lisovy Khutory
- Lukashivka
- Pidhayne
- Stavok
- Sulak
- Tertyshnyki
- Yablunivka
- Yasna Zirka

== See also ==
- List of hromadas of Ukraine
