= Komarivka rural hromada =

Komarivka rural hromada Комарівська сільська громада
- Hromada
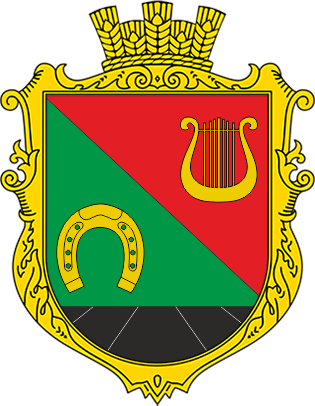
- Coat of arms
- Interactive map of Komarivka rural hromada
- Country: Ukraine
- Oblast: Chernihiv
- Raion: Nizhyn

Area
  - Total: 425.0 km^{2} (164.1 sq mi)

Population (2020)
  - Total: 4,539
  - Density: 10.68/km^{2} (27.66/sq mi)
- CATOTTG code: UA74040150000010608
- Settlements: 15
- Rural settlements: 1
- Villages: 14
- Website: komarivska.gromada.org.ua

Komarivka rural hromada (Ukrainian: Комарівська сільська громада) is a hromada of Ukraine, located in Nizhyn Raion, Chernihiv Oblast. Its administrative center is the village of Komarivka.

It has an area of 425.0 square kilometres (164.1 mi^{2}) and a population of 4,539, as of 2020.

== Composition ==
The hromada contains 15 settlements, with 14 villages:

- Berezivka
- Berestovets
- Volovitsa
- Vorona
- Illintsi
- Komarivka
- Krasnosilske
- Linivka
- Prokhori
- Sydorivka
- Smolyazh
- Stepanivka
- Khovmy
- Shevchenko

And 1 rural-type settlement: Zaporizhzhia.

== See also ==
- List of hromadas of Ukraine
