= Nizhyn Raion =

Subdivision of Chernihiv Oblast, Ukraine

Nizhyn Raion Ніжинський район
- Raion
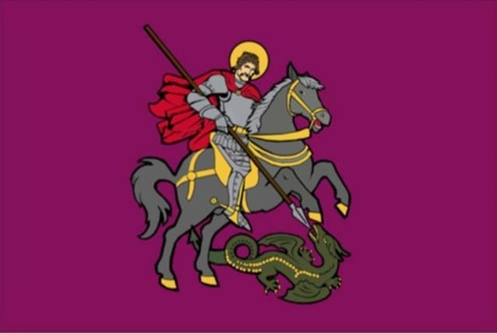
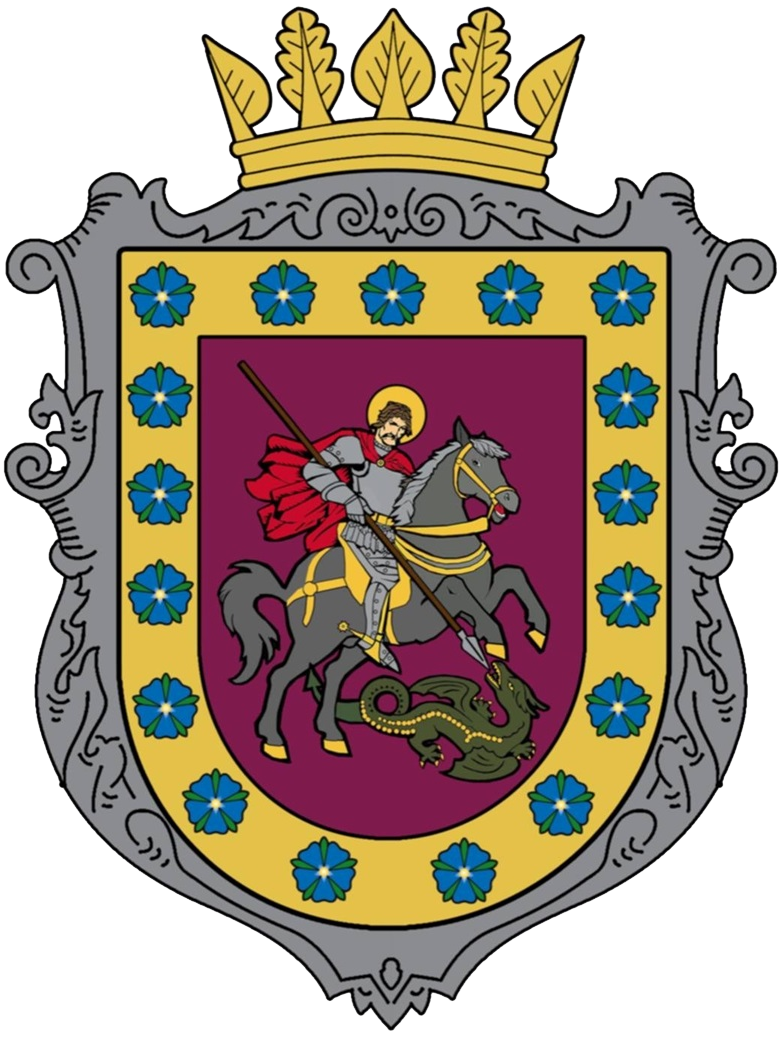
- Flag Coat of arms

- Raion location in Chernihiv Oblast
- Coordinates: 51°7′19″N 31°59′43″E
- Country: Ukraine
- Oblast: Chernihiv
- Admin. center: Nizhyn
- Subdivisions: 17 hromadas

Area
  - Total: 1,514 km^{2} (585 sq mi)

Population (2022)
  - Total: 215,908
  - Density: 142.6/km^{2} (369.4/sq mi)
- Time zone: UTC+2 (EET)
  - Summer (DST): UTC+3 (EEST)
- Website: http://neadm.cg.gov.ua/

Nizhyn Raion (Ukrainian: Ніжинський район) is a raion (district) of Chernihiv Oblast, northern Ukraine. Its administrative centre is located at Nizhyn. The area of Nizhyn Raion is located within the Dnieper Lowland, in Polissya. The leading sectors of the Nizhyn Raion economy are agriculture, food industry, and forestry. Population: 215,908 (2022 estimate).

== History ==
On 18 July 2020, as part of the administrative reform of Ukraine, the number of raions of Chernihiv Oblast was reduced to five, and the area of Nizhyn Raion was significantly expanded. Four abolished raions, Bakhmach, Bobrovytsia, Borzna, and Nosivka Raions, as well as the city of Nizhyn, which was previously incorporated as a city of oblast significance and did not belong to the raion, were merged into Nizhyn Raion. The January 2020 estimate of the raion population was 25,716 (2020 est.).

== Subdivisions ==
=== Current ===
After the reform in July 2020, the raion consists of 17 hromadas:

- Bakhmach urban hromada with the administration in the city of Bakhmach, transferred from Bakhmach Raion;
- Baturyn urban hromada with the administration in the city of Baturyn, transferred from Bakhmach Raion;
- Bobrovytsia urban hromada with the administration in the city of Bobrovytsia, transferred from Bobrovytsia Raion;
- Borzna urban hromada with the administration in the city of Borzna, transferred from Borzna Raion;
- Dmytrivka settlement hromada with the administration in the rural settlement of Dmytrivka, transferred from Bakhmach Raion;
- Komarivka rural hromada with the administration in the selo of Komarivka, transferred from Borzna Raion;
- Kruty rural hromada with the administration in the selo of Kruty, retained from Nizhyn Raion;
- Losynivka settlement hromada with the administration in the rural settlement of Losynivka, retained from Nizhyn Raion;
- Makiivka rural hromada with the administration in the selo of Makiivka, transferred from Nosivka Raion;
- Mryn rural hromada with the administration in the selo of Mryn, transferred from Nosivka Raion;
- Nizhyn urban hromada with the administration in the city of Nizhyn, was previously a city of oblast significance;
- Nosivka urban hromada with the administration in the city of Nosivka, transferred from Nosivka Raion;
- Nova Basan rural hromada with the administration in the selo of Nova Basan, transferred from Bobrovytsia Raion;
- Plysky rural hromada with the administration in the selo of Plysky, transferred from Borzna Raion;
- Talalaivka rural hromada with the administration in the selo of Talalaivka, retained from Nizhyn Raion;
- Vertiivka rural hromada with the administration in the selo of Vertiivka, retained from Nizhyn Raion;
- Vysoke rural hromada with the administration in the selo of Vysoke, transferred from Borzna Raion.

=== Before 2020 ===
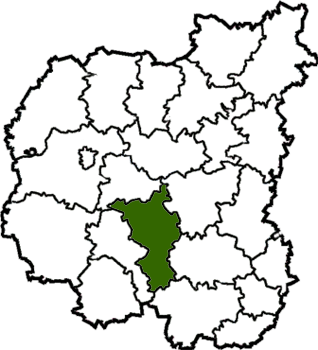
Nizhyn Raion in Chernihiv Oblast before 2020

Before the 2020 reform, the raion consisted of four hromadas:

- Kruty rural hromada with the administration in Kruty;
- Losynivka settlement hromada with the administration in Losynivka;
- Talalaivka rural hromada with the administration in Talalaivka;
- Vertiivka rural hromada with the administration in Vertiivka.

== Geography ==
Nizhyn Raion is located in the southern and central-eastern part of Chernihiv region. It borders Pryluky and Chernihiv Raions of Chernihiv Oblast and Sumy and Kyiv Oblasts.The distance to the regional center by railway is 87 km, by highways 90 km.

The area of Nizhyn Raion is located within the Dnieper Lowland. The relief of the district's surface is a lowland plain, in places dissected by river valleys. All rivers belong to the Dnieper basin. Nizhyn Raion is located on the watershed of the Sula and Desna rivers. The largest river in the district is Oster (a left tributary of the Desna) and the Seym (left tributary of the Desna). In the floodplains of the rivers there are oxbow lake forests and lowland swamps.

The climate of Nizhyn Raion is moderately continental, with warm summers and relatively mild winters. The average temperature in January is about -7°C, and in July - +19°C. The average annual precipitation ranges from 550 to 660 mm, with the highest amount of precipitation in the summer period.

The soil cover of the district is dominated by chernozem and swamps soils. Nizhyn Raion is located in the natural zone of the forest steppe, in Polissya. The main species in the forests are oak, alder, ash, and birch. Minerals raion: peat, sand, clay.

== Economy ==
The leading sectors of the Nizhyn Raion economy are agriculture, food industry, and forestry. Agriculture specializes in growing grain and industrial crops, cattle breeding, and pig breeding.

=== Transportation ===
The railway tracks of the South-Western Railway pass through the Nizhyn Raion in the direction of Chernihiv-Pryluky-Bakhmach and Hlukhiv-Kyiv. The main railway stations are Nizhyn and Bakhmach. The state highways M01 and M02 pass through the territory of the Raion.
