= European route E38 in Ukraine =

Ukrainian part of European route E38

European route E 38
- Автошлях E38

Route information
- Maintained by Ukravtodor

Major junctions
- West end: E101 north of Hlukhiv
- P 44 in Hlukhiv
- East end: E38 at Russia border

Location
- Country: Ukraine

Highway system
- Roads in Ukraine; State Highways

European route E 38 (E 38) is a west–east European route, running from Hlukhiv in Ukraine to Shymkent in Kazakhstan. In Ukraine, the highway runs from the intersection with European route E 101, through Hlukhiv to the Russian border near Katerynivka.

== Main route ==
Route follows P 65.

Route E38
Chernihiv Oblast
Hlukhiv Raion
| Bereza | E101 E391 M 02 Т-1915 | |
| Hlukhiv | P 44 | |
| Zarutske | | |
| Katerynivka | Border checkpoint with Russia | 37 kilometres (23 mi) |

== See also ==
European route E38
| Previous country: Terminus | Ukraine | Next country: Russia |
