= Highway M03 (Ukraine) =

Highway in Ukraine

Highway M03
- Автошлях М03
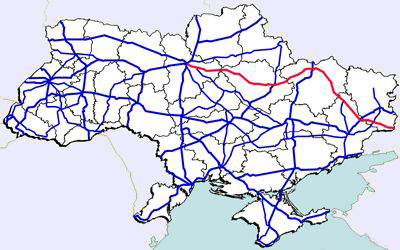

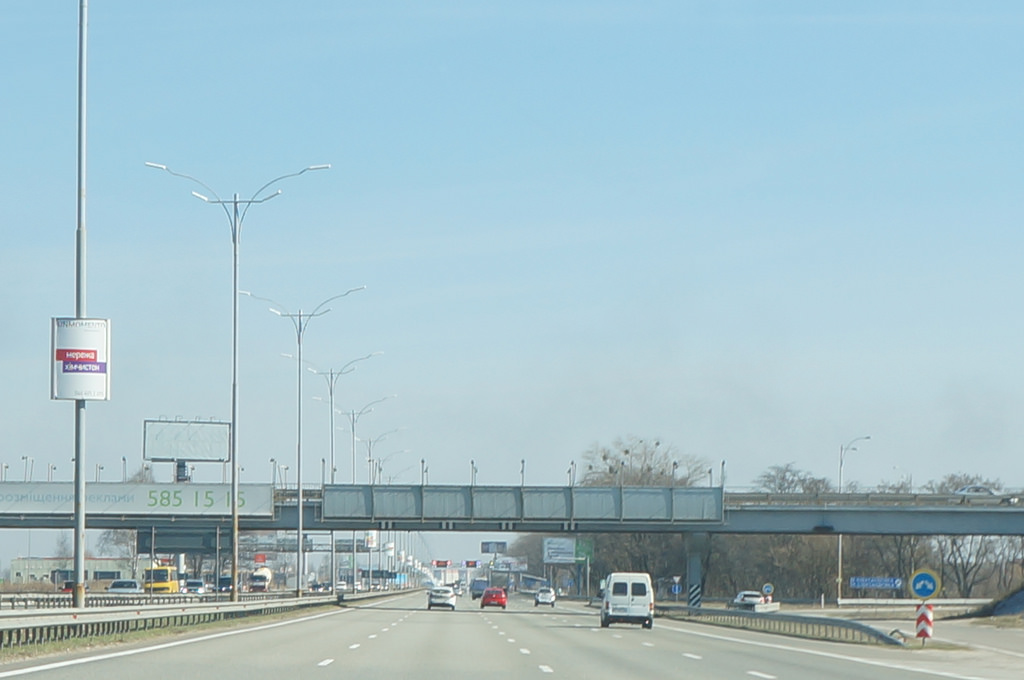

Route information
- Part of
- Length: 844.2 km (524.6 mi) 858.9 km (533.7 mi) with access roads

Kyiv - Boryspil (part of E40)
- Length: 18 km (11 mi)

E40 (main)
- Length: 1 km (0.62 mi)
- West end: (Kyiv) E40 M 06 E101 E95 E373
- Major intersections: (Poltava) E584 (Kharkiv) E105
- East end: (Debaltseve) E40 M 04 E50

E50 (Donbas)
- Length: 1 km (0.62 mi)
- West end: (Debaltseve) E50 M 04 E40
- East end: (Dovzhansky) (Sverdlovsk Raion) / E50 M 19 (Russia)

Location
- Country: Ukraine
- Oblasts: Kyiv, Kyiv, Poltava, Kharkiv, Donetsk, Luhansk

Highway system
- Roads in Ukraine; State Highways
← M 02	→ M 05

Highway M03 is a Ukrainian international highway (M-highway) connecting Kyiv with Dovzhansky on the border with Russia, where it continues into Russia as the A270. It is part of European route E40 from Kyiv to Debaltseve at which it is part of European route E50 to the border with Russia. At 844 km (524 mi), the M03 is the longest international state highway in Ukraine.

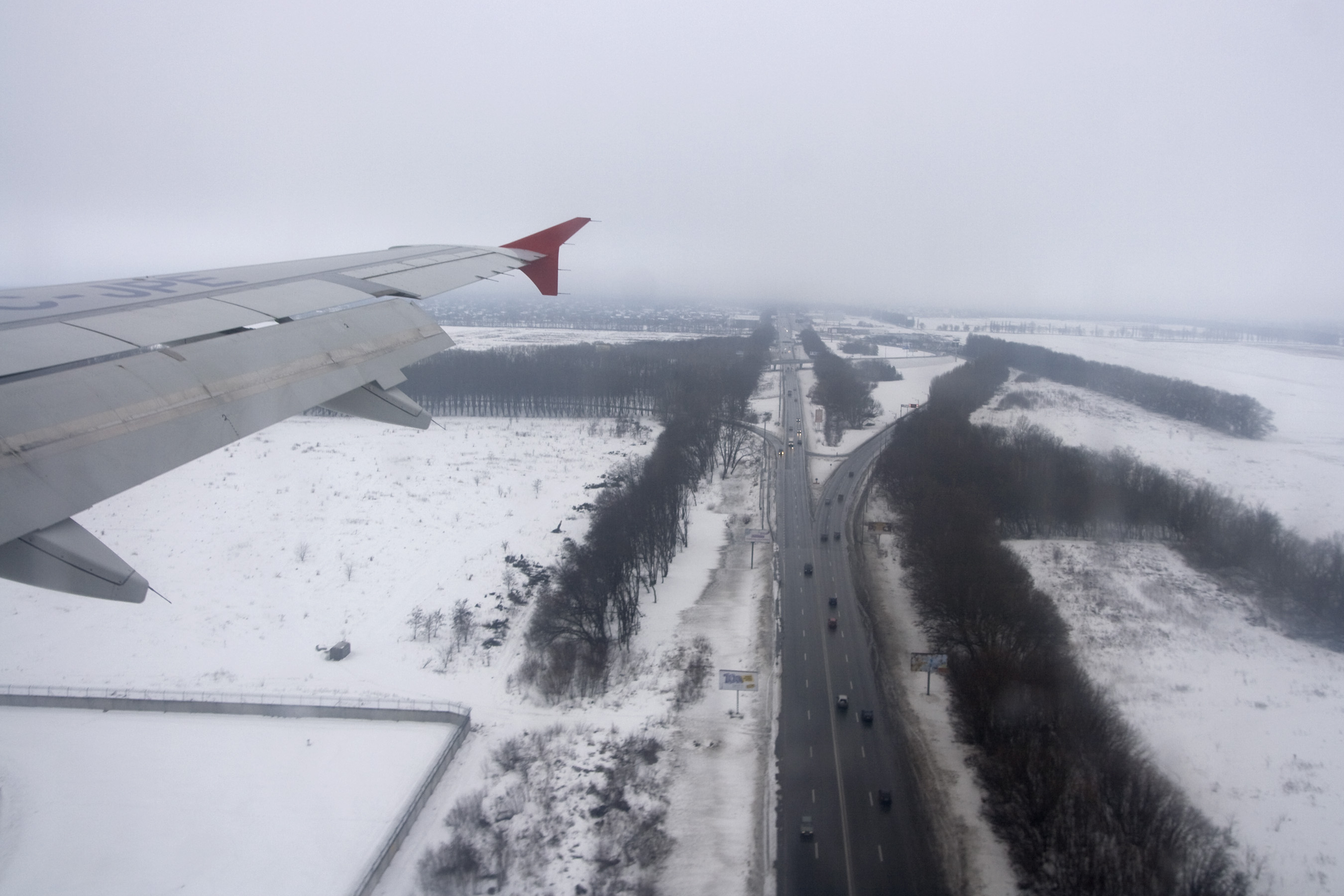
M03 near Boryspil International Airport

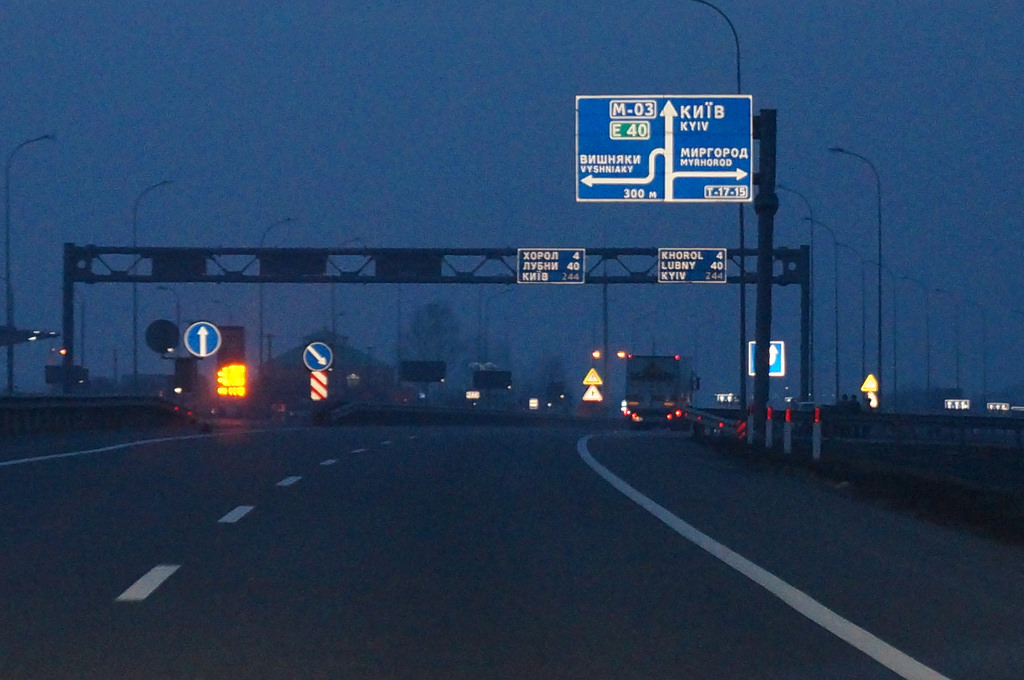
M03 road in Poltava region

In Soviet times the M03 was part of the M19. Today, the highway stretches through five oblasts and ends at the border checkpoint at Dovzhansky which is part of Sverdlovsk Raion (Luhansk Oblast). The route connects Kyiv and Kharkiv with the industrial region of Donbas. Part of the M03 between Kyiv and Boryspil was reconstructed into an automagistral to handle higher traffic between Kyiv and the Boryspil International Airport.

From Boryspil to Lubny, the road is a dual carriageway, thereon it continues as a single carriageway with some 2x2 sections.

Significant armed conflict has occurred on or near the eastern portions of the highway during the war in Donbas and the 2022 Russian Invasion of Ukraine.

== Kyiv - Boryspil ==
Kyiv – Boryspil auto-magistrale is the better kept motorway in Ukraine. It provides direct access from Kyiv to the Boryspil International Airport. Its traffic passing ability amasses to 40,000 vehicle per day. It has length of 18 km (11 mi) with maximum allowable speed at 130 km/h (81 mph). The motorway is part of the M03 that stretches from Kyiv to the Russo-Ukrainian border at the Dovzhansky border checkpoint.

== Route ==
Marker, km	Main settlements	Notes	Highway Interchanges
0 km	Kyiv		E95/ E101 ( M 01 - M 05) • E373 M 07 • E40 M 06 • H 01 • H 07
18 km	Boryspil		H 08
	Poltava		E584 ( M 22) • H 12
	Liubotyn		E105
	Kharkiv		E105 ( M 18 / M 20)
	Sloviansk		H 20
	Debaltseve		E40/ E50 ( M 04)
844.2 km	Dovzhansky / Border (Russia)		(Russia) A270

== See also ==
- Roads in Ukraine
- Ukraine Highways
- International E-road network
- Pan-European corridors
