= P44 =

P44 or P-44 may refer to:

== Vessels ==
- ARA Parker (P-44), a corvette of the Argentine Navy
- HMS United (P44), a submarine of the Royal Navy
- INS Kirpan (P44), a corvette of the Indian Navy
- Spanish patrol vessel Tornado (P-44)

== Other uses ==
- P44 (classification), a Modern pentathlon classification
- Feinwerkbau P44, a match pistol
- MAPK3, p44 mitogen-activated protein kinase
- P44 road (Ukraine)
- Papyrus 44, a biblical manuscript
- Phosphorus-44, an isotope of phosphorus
- Republic P-44 Rocket, a proposed American fighter aircraft
- P44, a Latvian state regional road
