= P61 road (Ukraine) =

Road in Ukraine

Road P61
- Автошлях Р61

Route information
- Length: 109.6 km (68.1 mi) 0.8 km (0.5 mi) branch to "Hetman's Capital" National Park

Major junctions
- West end: M 01 in Baturyn
- P60 in Konotop
- East end: P44 P45 H 07 / H 30 in Sumy

Location
- Country: Ukraine
- Oblasts: Chernihiv, Sumy

Highway system
- Roads in Ukraine; State Highways
← P 60	→ P 62

P61 is a regional Ukraine road (P-highway) in Sumy Oblast, Ukraine, running mainly west-east and connecting Baturyn with Sumy in a more or less straight line. It begins at Highway M01/European route E101 and passes through Mytchenky, Krasne (Chernihiv Oblast), Popivka, Konotop, Simyanivka, Dubovyazivka, Krasne (Sumy Oblast), Chernecha Sloboda, Terny, Bobryk, Tuchne, Mykolaivka, Stepanivka, and ends in Sumy at Stepana Bandera Street (Highway H07) and Illinska Street (Highway H30/Highway P45). There is also a branch road starting at Highway M03/European route E101 to Hetman's Capital National Park.

== Main route ==
Main route and intersections with other highways in Ukraine.

Marker	Settlements with intersecting highways	Notes	Highway Interchanges
0 km	Baturyn		M 01 E101
	Konotop		P60
	near Simyanivka		T-19-10
	Chernecha Sloboda		T-19-14
	Terny		T-19-04
	Mykolaivka		T-19-06
106.6 km	Sumy		P44 P45 H 07 H 30

Hetman's Capital National Park branch.

Marker	Places	Notes	Highway Interchanges
0 km	Baturyn - M01/E101		M 01 E101
0.8 km	Baturyn - Hetman's Capital National Park		

== See also ==
- Roads in Ukraine
- Ukraine State Highways
