= E101 =

E101 may refer to:

- Riboflavin, food additive which has been assigned E number 101
- Flavin mononucleotide, biomolecule produced from riboflavin
- European route E101, road of International E-road network between Kyiv and Moscow
- E101, a form for stating applicable legislation within the European Economic Area and Switzerland
