= H28 =

H28 may refer to:

- Highway H28 (Ukraine)
- HNoMS Draug (H28), a Royal Norwegian Navy Draug-class destroyer
- HMS H28, a Royal Navy H-class submarine
- HMS Sturdy (H28), a Royal Navy S-class destroyer
- London Buses route H28, a Transport for London contracted bus route
- Whetstone International Airport, on the Canada-US border in Alberta and Montana
