= Domanove =

Village in western Ukraine

Domanove Доманове
- Coordinates: 51°49′26″N 24°20′30″E
- Country: Ukraine
- Oblast: Volyn Oblast
- Raion: Kovel Raion
- Hromada: Ratne Hromada
- Rural council: Mlynove Rural Council

Government
  - Mayor: Anatoliy Onishchuk (Ukrainian People's Party)

Area
  - Total: 734 km^{2} (283 sq mi)
- Elevation: 151 m (495 ft)

Population (2001)
  - Total: 289
  - Density: 393.73/km^{2} (1,019.8/sq mi)
- Postal code: 44188
- Area code: +380 3366

Domanove (Ukrainian: Доманове, Polish: Domanowo) is a village in Kovel Raion, Rivne Oblast, Ukraine.

== Geography ==
Situated in the northwest corner of Ukraine, Domanove is located on Ukraine's border with Belarus. The Domanove border checkpoint is just north of the village; the Belarusian town of Mokrany is directly across the border. It lies on European route E85, which connects it to the regional capital of Lutsk, 148 kilometers to the southwest. Domanove is 23 kilometers from Ratne, the nearest sizable town.

In the interwar period, the village was a part of the Volhynian Voivodeship of the Second Polish Republic.

=== Climate ===
The village experiences a humid continental climate.

== Demographics ==
The 1989 census of the Ukrainian Soviet Socialist Republic reported a population of 293 in the village. By the Ukrainian census of 2001, the population fell to 289.

=== Language ===
According to the 2001 census, 98.96% of residents spoke Ukrainian as their first language, 0.69% spoke Russian, and 0.35% spoke Belarusian.

== Gallery ==
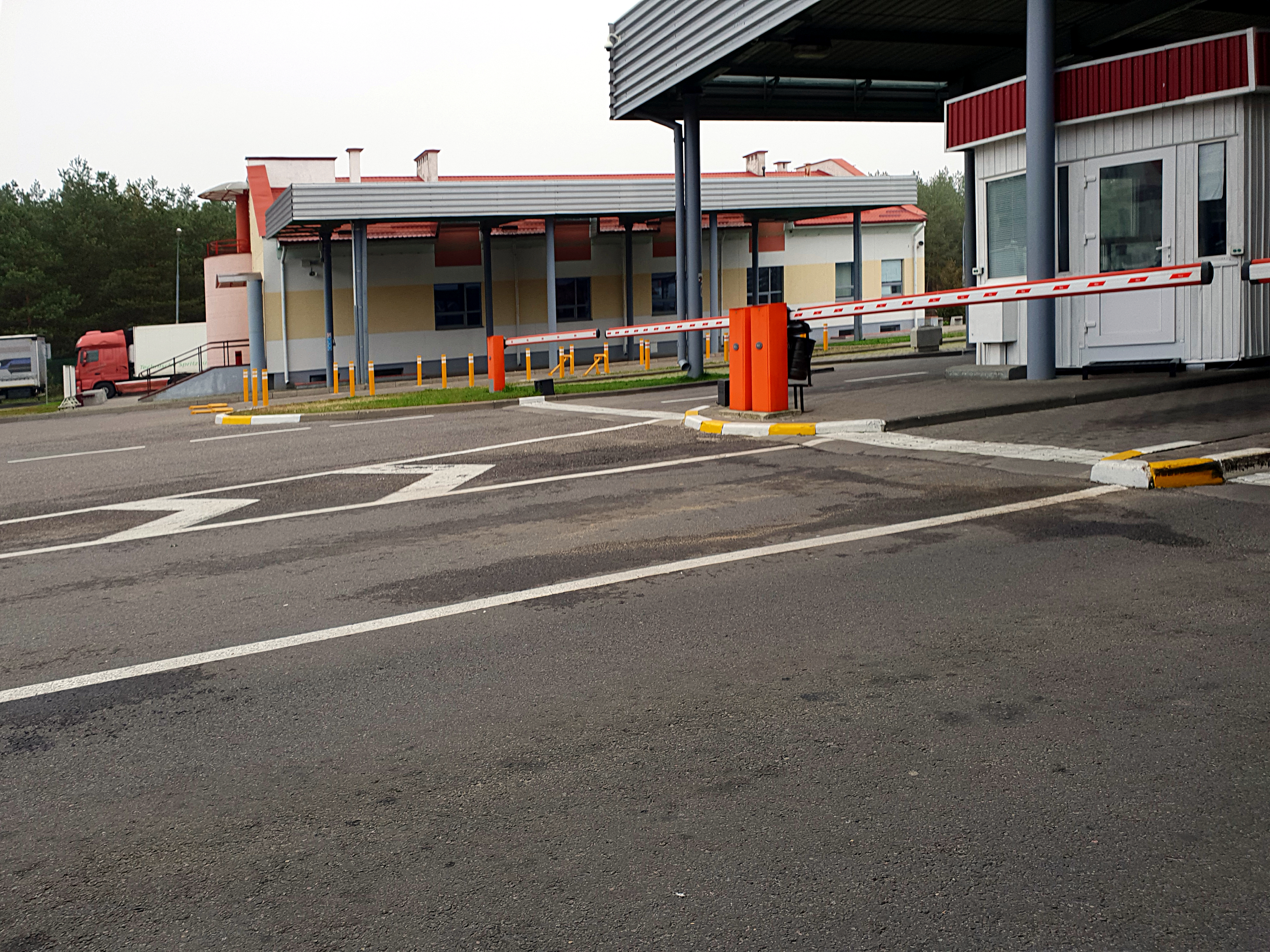
The Domanove border checkpoint

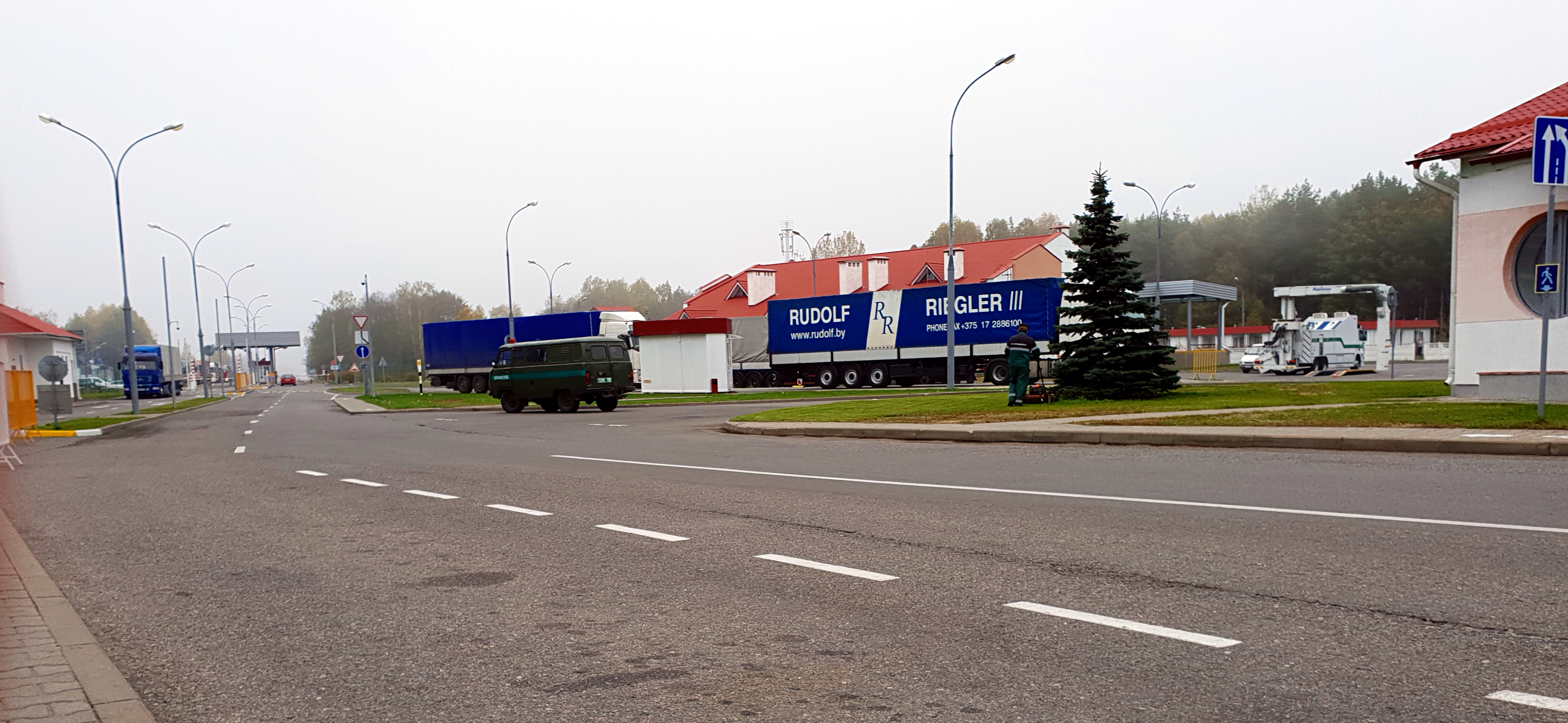
A truck stopped at the border crossing

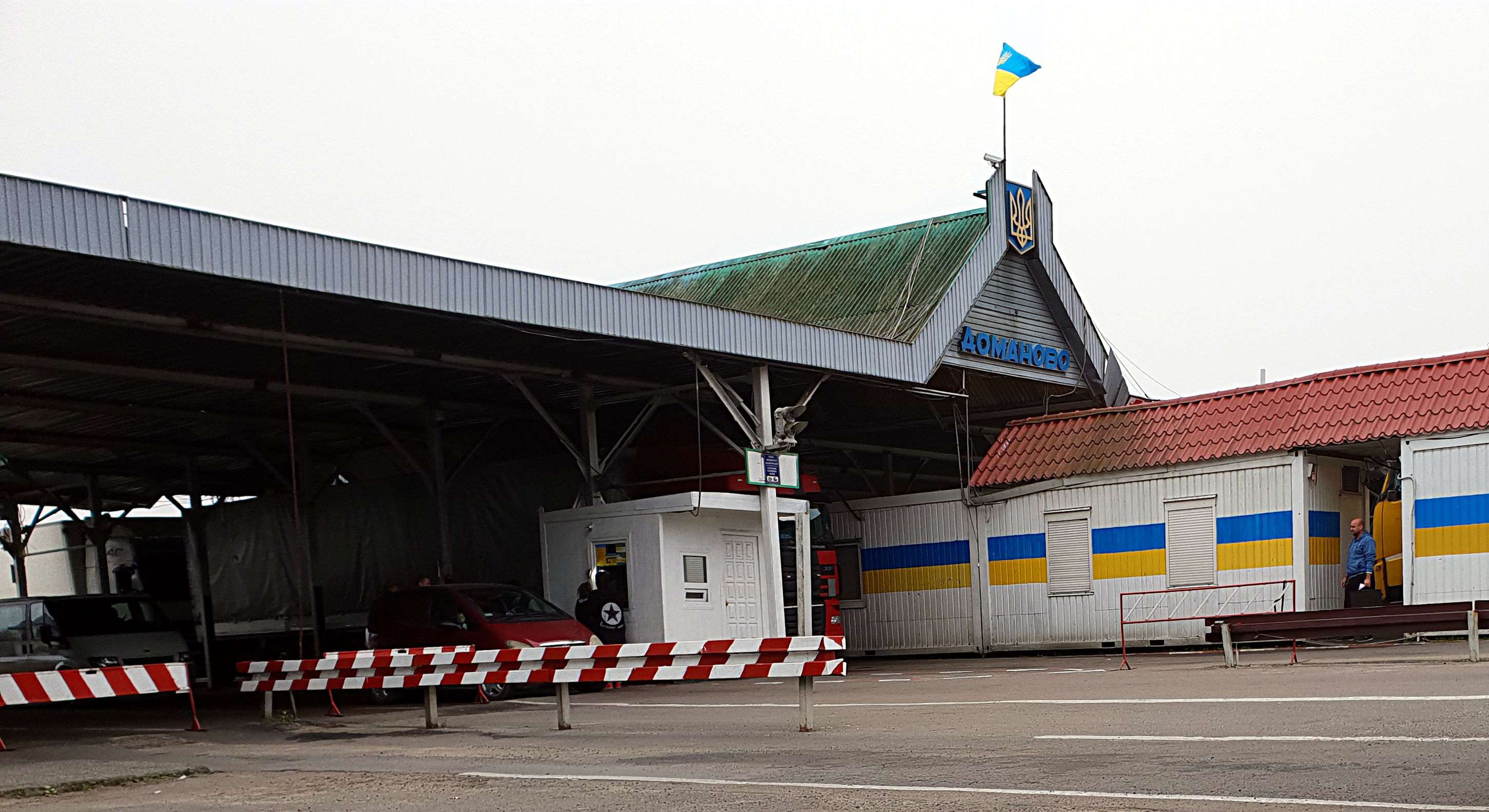
Ukrainian border control at the Domanove checkpoint

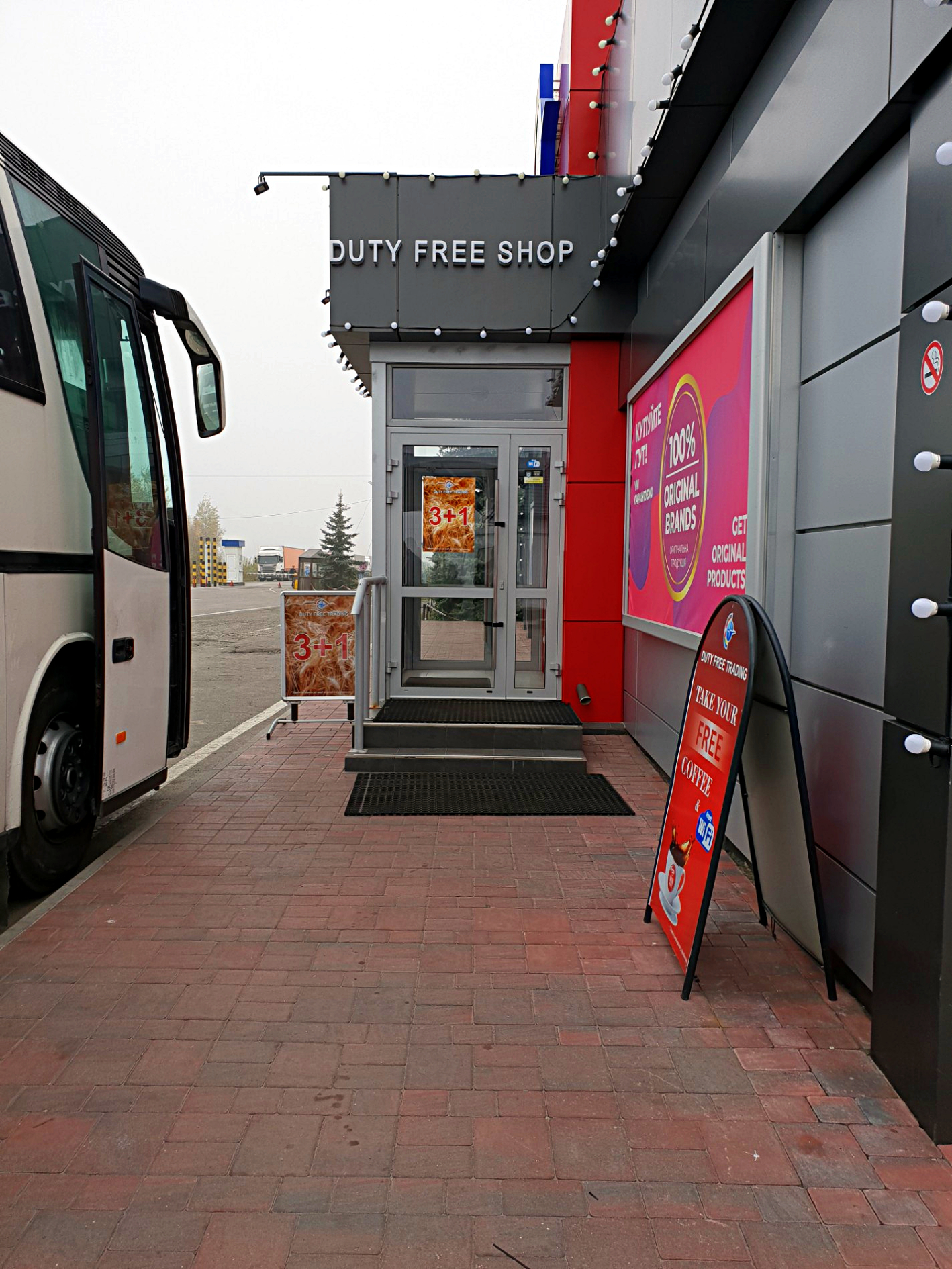
Duty free store in Domanove, on the Ukrainian side of the border with Belarus

== See also ==
- Domanove (border checkpoint)
- Kovel Raion
- Ratne
