= European route E391 =

Road in trans-European E-road network

E391

Route information
- Length: 168 km (104 mi)

Major junctions
- East end: Trosna, Russia
- West end: Hlukhiv, Ukraine

Location
- Countries: Russia; Ukraine

Highway system
- International E-road network; A Class; B Class

The European road E391 or E391 is a European road running from Trosna in Russia to Hlukhiv in Ukraine.

== General ==
The European road 391 is a Class B connection road and connect the Russian city Trosna with the Ukrainian city Hlukhiv which makes it at a distance of approximately 160 kilometers. The route has been recorded by the UNECE as follows: Trosna - Hlukhiv.

== Route ==
- Ukraine
  - M 02: Hlukhiv (E101) - Russian border
- Russia
  - M 3: Ukrainian border - Kalinovka (E101)
  - A 142: Kalinovka - Trosna
