= P46 =

P46 or P-46 may refer to:

== Vessels ==
- ARA Gómez Roca (P-46), a corvette of the Argentine Navy
- HMS Unruffled (P46), a submarine of the Royal Navy
- INS Kuthar (P46), a corvette of the Indian Navy
- Spanish patrol vessel Furor (P-46)

== Other uses ==
- Curtiss XP-46, an American prototype fighter aircraft
- Heckler & Koch UCP, a prototype pistol
- P46 road (Ukraine)
- Papyrus 46, a biblical manuscripts in Greek
- Phosphorus-46, an isotope of phosphorus
- P46, a Latvian state regional road
