= Hubert Strassl =

German fighter ace and Knight's Cross recipient

Hubert Straßl
- Born: 24 May 1918; Linz, Austria
- Died: 8 July 1943 (aged 25); Ponyri, Russia
- Military career
- Allegiance: Nazi Germany
- Branch: Luftwaffe
- Service years: 1939–1943
- Rank: Oberfeldwebel (staff sergeant)
- Unit: JG 51
- Conflicts: World War II: Eastern Front; Operation Barbarossa; Battle of Kursk
- Awards: Knight's Cross of the Iron Cross

Hubert Straßl (Note: His name, in German, is spelled with a "sharp S"; see ß.) (24 May 1918 – 8 July 1943) was an Austrian-born German fighter pilot in the Luftwaffe and fought during World War II. He was credited with 67 aerial victories—that is, 67 aerial combat encounters resulting in the destruction of the enemy aircraft—claimed in 221 combat missions. He was "ace-in-a-day" four times, shooting down five or more aircraft on a single day. On 8 July 1943, during the Battle of Kursk, Straßl was killed in aerial combat with Soviet fighters near Ponyri.

== Career ==
Straßl was born on 24 May 1918 at Linz, Austria. Following completion of flight and fighter pilot training, (Note: Flight training in the Luftwaffe progressed through the levels A1, A2 and B1, B2, referred to as A/B flight training. A training included theoretical and practical training in aerobatics, navigation, long-distance flights and dead-stick landings. The B courses included high-altitude flights, instrument flights, night landings and training to handle the aircraft in difficult situations.) he was posted to Jagdgeschwader 51 (JG 51—51st Fighter Wing) in late 1941.

On 5 July 1943, he became a triple-ace in a day when he shot down 15 enemy aircraft in four missions south of Orel in Russia during the Battle of Kursk. Over the course of the three days, Straßl shot down 30 enemy aircraft. He was forced to bail out of his Focke-Wulf Fw 190 A-4 (Werknummer 2351—factory number) following combat with a Lavochkin-Gorbunov-Gudkov LaGG-3 south of Ponyri on 8 July. His parachute failed to fully deploy and he fell to his death. On 12 November 1943, Straßl was awarded a posthumous Knight's Cross of the Iron Cross (Ritterkreuz des Eisernen Kreuzes).

== Summary of career ==
=== Aerial victory claims ===
According to US historian David T. Zabecki, Straßl was credited with 67 aerial victories. Spick also lists Straßl with 67 enemy aircraft shot down, claimed in 221 combat missions, all of which on the Eastern Front, and a mission-to-claim ratio of 3.30. Mathews and Foreman, authors of Luftwaffe Aces – Biographies and Victory Claims, researched the German Federal Archives and found records for 67 aerial victory claims, all of which claimed on the Eastern Front.

Victory claims were logged to a map-reference (PQ = Planquadrat), for example "PQ 47722". The Luftwaffe grid map (Jägermeldenetz) covered all of Europe, western Russia and North Africa and was composed of rectangles measuring 15 minutes of latitude by 30 minutes of longitude, an area of about 360 square miles (930 km^{2}). These sectors were then subdivided into 36 smaller units to give a location area 3 km × 4 km (1.9 mi × 2.5 mi) in size.

Chronicle of aerial victories
This and the ♠ (Ace of spades) indicates those aerial victories which made Strassl an "ace-in-a-day", a term which designates a fighter pilot who has shot down five or more airplanes in a single day. This and the ? (question mark) indicates information discrepancies listed by Prien, Stemmer, Rodeike, Bock, Mathews and Foreman.
Claim	Date	Time	Type	Location	Claim	Date	Time	Type	Location
– 9. Staffel of Jagdgeschwader 51 – Eastern Front — 1 May 1942 – 3 February 1943
1	6 July 1942	06:35	Pe-2		8	19 August 1942	18:37	Pe-2	PQ 47722; 5 km (3.1 mi) southwest of Rzhev
2	4 August 1942	12:25	Il-2	PQ 37832; 45 km (28 mi) northeast of Bely	9	19 August 1942	18:40	Pe-2	PQ 47762; 15 km (9.3 mi) southwest of Zubtsov
3	4 August 1942	17:07	Pe-2	20 km (12 mi) northeast of Bely	10	19 August 1942	18:41	Pe-2	PQ 47762; 15 km (9.3 mi) southwest of Zubtsov
4	5 August 1942	11:58	LaGG-3	PQ 57782; 40 km (25 mi) southeast of Zubtsov	11	26 August 1942	06:10	LaGG-3	PQ 47824; 10 km (6.2 mi) east of Zubtsov
5	12 August 1942	09:45	Pe-2	PQ 47561; 15 km (9.3 mi) north of Rzhev	12	2 September 1942	08:50	Il-2	east-northeast of Sychyovka
6	13 August 1942	09:40	Pe-2	PQ 47562; 15 km (9.3 mi) north of Rzhev	13	26 November 1942	12:27	Il-2	PQ 46132; 20 km (12 mi) north of Konaja
7	19 August 1942	18:35	Pe-2	PQ 47583; 10 km (6.2 mi) west of Rzhev					
– 9. Staffel of Jagdgeschwader 51 – Eastern Front — 4 February – June 1943
14	30 May 1943	16:15	Pe-2	PQ 35 Ost 64183; 5 km (3.1 mi) southeast of Belyov	17	2 June 1943	04:02	MiG-3	PQ 35 Ost 63883; 20 km (12 mi) southeast of Zolotukhino
15	1 June 1943	16:40	MiG-3	PQ 35 Ot 63854; 20 km (12 mi) east-southeast of Zolotukhino	18	2 June 1943	04:10	MiG-3	PQ 35 Ost 63782; 20 km (12 mi) southwest of Zolotukhino
16	1 June 1943	16:42	MiG-3	PQ 35 Ost 63851; 20 km (12 mi) east-southeast of Zolotukhino	19	2 June 1943	07:35	MiG-3	PQ 35 Ost 62133; 25 km (16 mi) north-northeast of Kursk
– 8. Staffel of Jagdgeschwader 51 – Eastern Front — June – 8 July 1943
20	6 June 1943	14:55	MiG-3	PQ 35 Ost 63884; 20 km (12 mi) southeast of Zolotukhino	44♠	5 July 1943	10:36	La-5	PQ 35 Ost 63544; 10 km (6.2 mi) south-southeast of Trosna
21	6 June 1943	14:58	La-5	PQ 35 Ost 63842; 5 km (3.1 mi) southeast of Zolotukhino	45♠	5 July 1943	10:42	Il-2	PQ 35 Ost 63542; 10 km (6.2 mi) south-southeast of Trosna
22♠	8 June 1943	10:47	Il-2 m.H. (Note: The "m.H." refers to an Ilyushin Il-2 with rear gunner (mit Heckschütze).)	PQ 35 Ost 63573; 20 km (12 mi) south-southeast of Trosna	46♠	5 July 1943	10:46	La-5	PQ 35 Ost 63551; 15 km (9.3 mi) west of Maloarkhangelsk
23♠	8 June 1943	10:50	Il-2 m.H.	PQ 35 Ost 63721; 20 km (12 mi) west of Zolotukhino	47♠	5 July 1943	10:49	Boston	PQ 35 Ost 63564; 10 km (6.2 mi) southwest of Maloarkhangelsk
24♠	8 June 1943	10:51	Yak-1	PQ 35 Ost 63722; 20 km (12 mi) west of Zolotukhino	48♠	5 July 1943	10:51	La-5	PQ 35 Ost 63532; 15 km (9.3 mi) west of Maloarkhangelsk
25♠	8 June 1943	19:04	MiG-3	PQ 35 Ost 64722; 15 km (9.3 mi) south of Telchje	49♠	5 July 1943	18:24	Il-2 m.H.	PQ 35 Ost 63562; 10 km (6.2 mi) southwest of Maloarkhangelsk
26♠	8 June 1943	19:06	La-5	PQ 35 Ost 64751; 20 km (12 mi) northeast of Oryol	50♠	5 July 1943	18:27	Il-2 m.H.	PQ 35 Ost 63621; 15 km (9.3 mi) east-northeast of Maloarkhangelsk
27♠	8 June 1943	19:17	La-5	PQ 35 Ost 63171; 10 km (6.2 mi) west of Zmiyovka	51♠	5 July 1943	18:31	Il-2 m.H.	PQ 35 Ost 63551; 15 km (9.3 mi) west of Maloarkhangelsk
28	11 June 1943	10:58	MiG-3	PQ 35 Ost 64352; 20 km (12 mi) south-southeast of Belyov	52♠	5 July 1943	18:33	Il-2 m.H.	PQ 35 Ost 63522; 20 km (12 mi) west-northwest of Maloarkhangelsk
29	11 June 1943	11:05	MiG-3	PQ 35 Ost 64354; 20 km (12 mi) south-southeast of Belyov	53	6 July 1943	12:34	La-5	PQ 35 Ost 63654; 15 km (9.3 mi) east-southeast of Maloarkhangelsk
30	11 June 1943	11:11	MiG-3	PQ 35 Ost 64382; 20 km (12 mi) northeast of Bolkhov	54	6 July 1943	12:37	MiG-3	PQ 35 Ost 63652; 15 km (9.3 mi) east-southeast of Maloarkhangelsk
31	14 June 1943	08:12	MiG-3	PQ 35 Ost 64383; 20 km (12 mi) northeast of Bolkhov	55	6 July 1943	12:40	La-5	PQ 35 Ost 63653; 15 km (9.3 mi) east-southeast of Maloarkhangelsk
32	20 June 1943	18:12	MiG-3	PQ 35 Ost 64643; 10 km (6.2 mi) north of Mtsensk	56	6 July 1943	19:35	MiG-3	PQ 35 Ost 63582; 20 km (12 mi) southwest of Maloarkhangelsk
33	28 June 1943	07:06	MiG-3	PQ 35 Ost 635571; 20 km (12 mi) south-southeast of Trosna	57♠	7 July 1943	04:20	MiG-3	PQ 35 Ost 63751; 20 km (12 mi) west-southwest of Maloarkhangelsk
34	28 June 1943	07:08	MiG-3	PQ 35 Ost 63581; 20 km (12 mi) southwest of Maloarkhangelsk	58♠	7 July 1943	04:25	Il-2	PQ 35 Ost 63527; 20 km (12 mi) west-northwest of Maloarkhangelsk
35	28 June 1943	07:15	MiG-3	PQ 35 Ost 63592; 15 km (9.3 mi) south-southwest of Maloarkhangelsk	59♠	7 July 1943	09:10	La-5	PQ 35 Ost 63561; 20 km (12 mi) southwest of Maloarkhangelsk
36	30 June 1943	06:25	MiG-3	PQ 35 Ost 54121; 20 km (12 mi) south-southwest of Sukhinichi	60♠	7 July 1943	09:24	La-5	PQ 35 Ost 63583; 20 km (12 mi) southwest of Maloarkhangelsk
37	3 July 1943	17:38	Il-2	PQ 35 Ost 64521; 15 km (9.3 mi) north of Telchje	61♠	7 July 1943	09:26	La-5	PQ 35 Ost 63573; 20 km (12 mi) south-southeast of Trosna
38♠	5 July 1943	03:48	MiG-3	PQ 35 Ost 63651; 15 km (9.3 mi) east-southeast of Maloarkhangelsk	62♠	7 July 1943	18:36	La-5	PQ 35 Ost 63714 vicinity of Zalegoshch
39♠	5 July 1943	03:50	MiG-3	PQ 35 Ost 63631; 25 km (16 mi) east-northeast of Maloarkhangelsk	63♠	8 July 1943	12:20	MiG-3	PQ 35 Ost 63387; 20 km (12 mi) southwest of Maloarkhangelsk
40♠	5 July 1943	07:18	MiG-3	PQ 35 Ost 63651; 15 km (9.3 mi) east-southeast of Maloarkhangelsk	64♠	8 July 1943	12:25? (Note: According to Mathews and Foreman claimed at 12:25.)	Boston	PQ 35 Ost 63675
41♠	5 July 1943	07:25	MiG-3	PQ 35 Ost 63613; 5 km (3.1 mi) northeast of Maloarkhangelsk	65♠	8 July 1943	17:35	LaGG-3	PQ 35 Ost 63584; 20 km (12 mi) southwest of Maloarkhangelsk
42♠	5 July 1943	07:28	MiG-3	PQ 35 Ost 63652; 15 km (9.3 mi) east-southeast of Maloarkhangelsk	66♠	8 July 1943	17:50	La-5	PQ 35 Ost 63582; 20 km (12 mi) southwest of Maloarkhangelsk
43♠	5 July 1943	10:34	La-5	PQ 35 Ost 63543; 10 km (6.2 mi) south-southeast of Trosna	67♠	8 July 1943	17:51	La-5	PQ 35 Ost 63582; 20 km (12 mi) southwest of Maloarkhangelsk

=== Awards ===
- Front Flying Clasp of the Luftwaffe in Gold
- Iron Cross (1939) 2nd and 1st Class
- Honor Goblet of the Luftwaffe (22 July 1943)
- German Cross in Gold on 16 August 1943 as Feldwebel in the 8./Jagdgeschwader 51
- Knight's Cross of the Iron Cross on 12 November 1943 (posthumously) as Oberfeldwebel and pilot in the 8./Jagdgeschwader 51 "Mölders"
