= Highway H12 (Ukraine) =

Highway in Ukraine

Highway H12
- Автошлях Н12
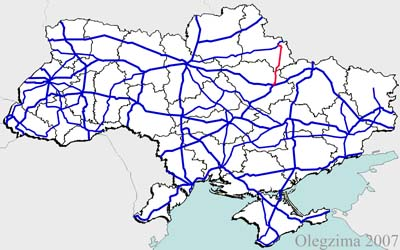

Route information
- Length: 154.4 km (95.9 mi) 170.2 km (105.8 mi) with bypass in Sumy

Major junctions
- North end: T1901 T1909 P45 P61 H 07 in Sumy
- South end: M 03 E40 in Poltava

Location
- Country: Ukraine
- Oblasts: Sumy, Poltava

Highway system
- Roads in Ukraine; State Highways
← H 11	→ H 13

H12 is an important Ukraine national highway (H-highway) in Sumy and Poltava Oblasts, Ukraine, running mainly north–south, and connecting Sumy with Poltava in a more or less straight line. It begins in Sumy at Bandera Street (Highway H07/Highway P61) and Illinska Street, and travels straight through central Sumy. It passes through Syrovatka, Boromlya, Trostianets, Klymentove, Okhtyrka, Khukhra, Kotelva, Velyki Budyshcha, and Dykanka, and then loops around Poltava and terminates at the intersection of Highway M03 and Polovky Street.

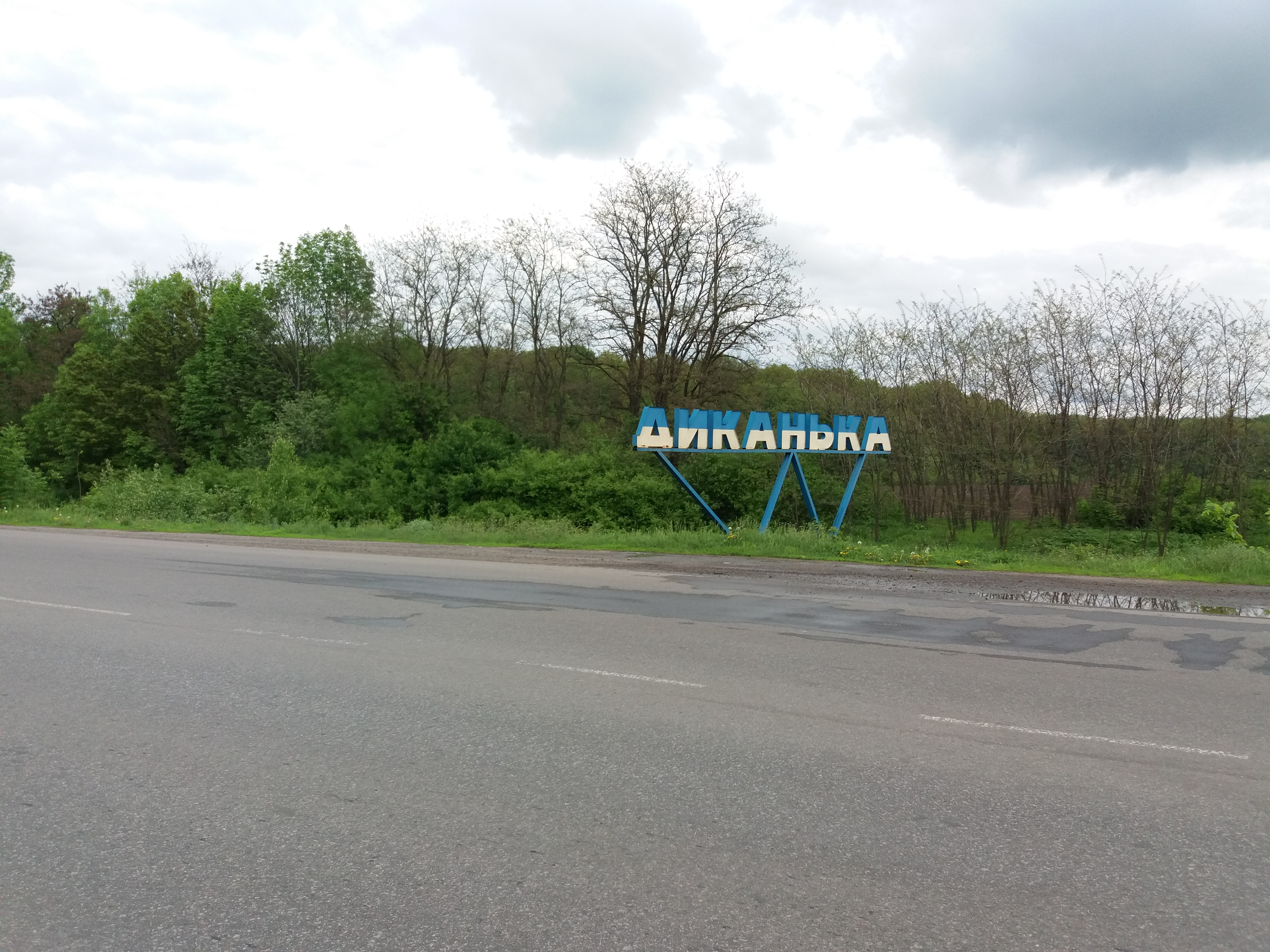
Entering Dykanka sign in Poltava Oblast

== Main route ==
Province	Municipality	km	mi	Exit	Destinations	Notes
Sumy Oblast	Sumy Raion	0.0	0.0		T1901 T1909 P45 P61 H 12 - Sumy	
Sumy Oblast	Sumy Raion				P45 - Verkhnia Syrovatka	
Sumy Oblast	Krasnopillia Raion					
Sumy Oblast	Trostianets Raion				Boromlya	
Sumy Oblast	Trostianets Raion				T1913 - Trostianets	
Sumy Oblast	Okhtyrka Raion				Klymentove	
Sumy Oblast	Okhtyrka Raion				T1705 T1929 P46 - Okhtyrka	
Sumy Oblast	Okhtyrka Raion				Hai-Moshenka	
Sumy Oblast	Okhtyrka Raion				Khukhra	
Poltava Oblast	Poltava Raion				T1729 - Kotelva	
Poltava Oblast	Poltava Raion				T1702	
Poltava Oblast	Poltava Raion				Lykhachivka	
Poltava Oblast	Zinkiv Raion				P45	
Poltava Oblast	Poltava Raion				Velyki Budyshcha	
Poltava Oblast	Poltava Raion				T1718 - Dykanka	
Poltava Oblast	Poltava Raion				Takhtaulove	
Poltava Oblast	Poltava Raion	170.2	105.8		M 03 E40 - Poltava	
1.000 mi = 1.609 km; 1.000 km = 0.621 mi

== See also ==
- Roads in Ukraine
- Ukraine State Highways
