= P65 =

P65 may refer to:

- Aldus PageMaker, discontinued desktop publishing software
- GRASP65, golgi reassembly stacking protein 1
- Grumman XP-65, an American fighter aircraft design
- HMS Upstart (P65), a submarine of the Royal Navy
- P65 road (Ukraine)
- Papyrus 65, a biblical manuscript
- RELA, transcription factor p65
- P65, a state regional road in Latvia
- Proposition 65, a California hazardous substance law.
- P6_{5}, three-dimensional space group number 170
