= P46 road (Ukraine) =

Road in Ukraine

Road P46
- Автошлях Р46

Route information
- Length: 131 km (81 mi)

Major junctions
- West end: T1705 T1929 H 12 in Okhtyrka
- East end: M 03 E40 E105 in Kharkiv

Location
- Country: Ukraine
- Oblasts: Sumy, Kharkiv

Highway system
- Roads in Ukraine; State Highways
← P 45	→ P 47

P46 is a regional Ukraine road (P-highway) in Sumy Oblast and Kharkiv Oblast, Ukraine, running mainly west–east and connecting Okhtyrka with Kharkiv in a more or less straight line. It begins at Highway H12 in Okhtyrka and passes through Khodunaivka, Kupjevakha, Hubarivka, Bohodukhiv, Musiyki, Krysynska, Maksymivka, Horkoho, Vilshany, Dvorichnyi Kut, Peresichne, Solonytsivka, Podvirky, and finally arrives to the Kholodnohirsk District of Kharkiv at Zalyutynska Street and Poltavskyi Shlyakh Street (Highway M01).

== Main route ==
Main route and intersections with other highways in Ukraine.

Marker	Settlements with intersecting highways	Notes	Highway interchanges
0 km	Okhtyrka		T1705 T1929 H 12
	Hubarivka		T1702
	Bohodukhiv		P45
	Maksymivka		T2113
	Persichne		T2112
	Kharkiv		M 03 E40 E105

== See also ==
- Roads in Ukraine
- Ukraine State Highways
