= Domanove (border checkpoint) =

Belarusian-Ukrainian border checkpoint

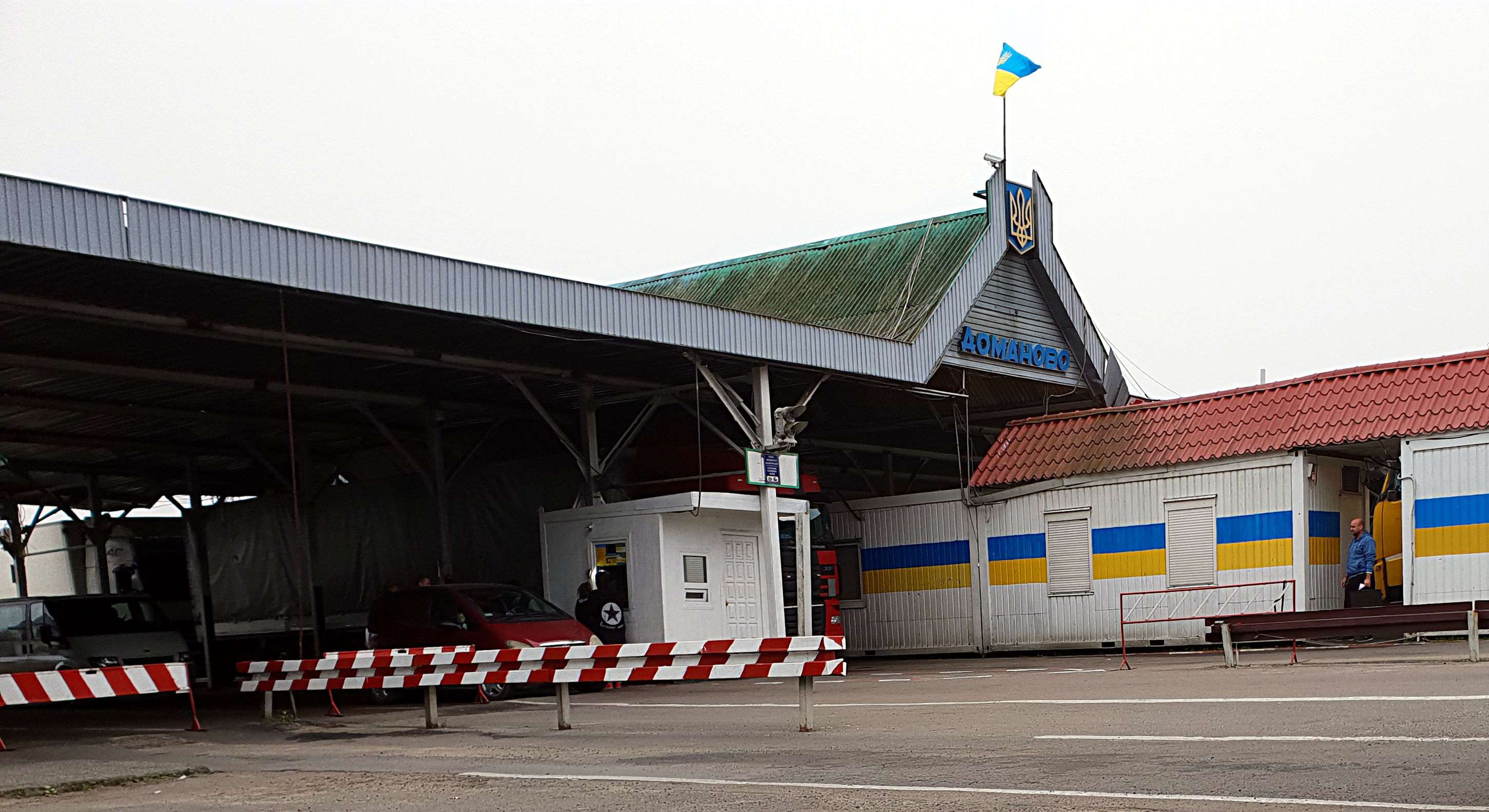

Locaiton
- Country: Ukraine
- Location: outside of Domanove, Kovel Raion
- Coordinates: 51°49′14″N 24°19′19″E

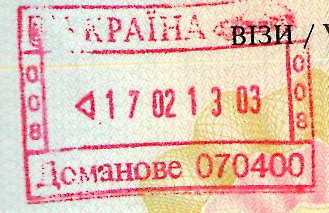
Visa stamp from the Domanove border crossing

Domanove (Ukrainian: Доманове) is a border crossing between Belarus and Ukraine, just north of village of Domanove, Kovel Raion, Volyn Oblast.

== Overview ==
The checkpoint/crossing is situated on the M 19 ( E85). Named after village of Domanove that is located nearby.

Across the border on the Belarusian side is a border checkpoint Makrany.

The type of crossing is automobile, status - international. The types of transportation for automobile crossings are passenger and freight.

The port of entry is part of the Domanove customs post of Yahodyn customs.

== See also ==
- State border of Ukraine
