= P65 road (Ukraine) =

Road in Ukraine

Road P65
- Автошлях Р65
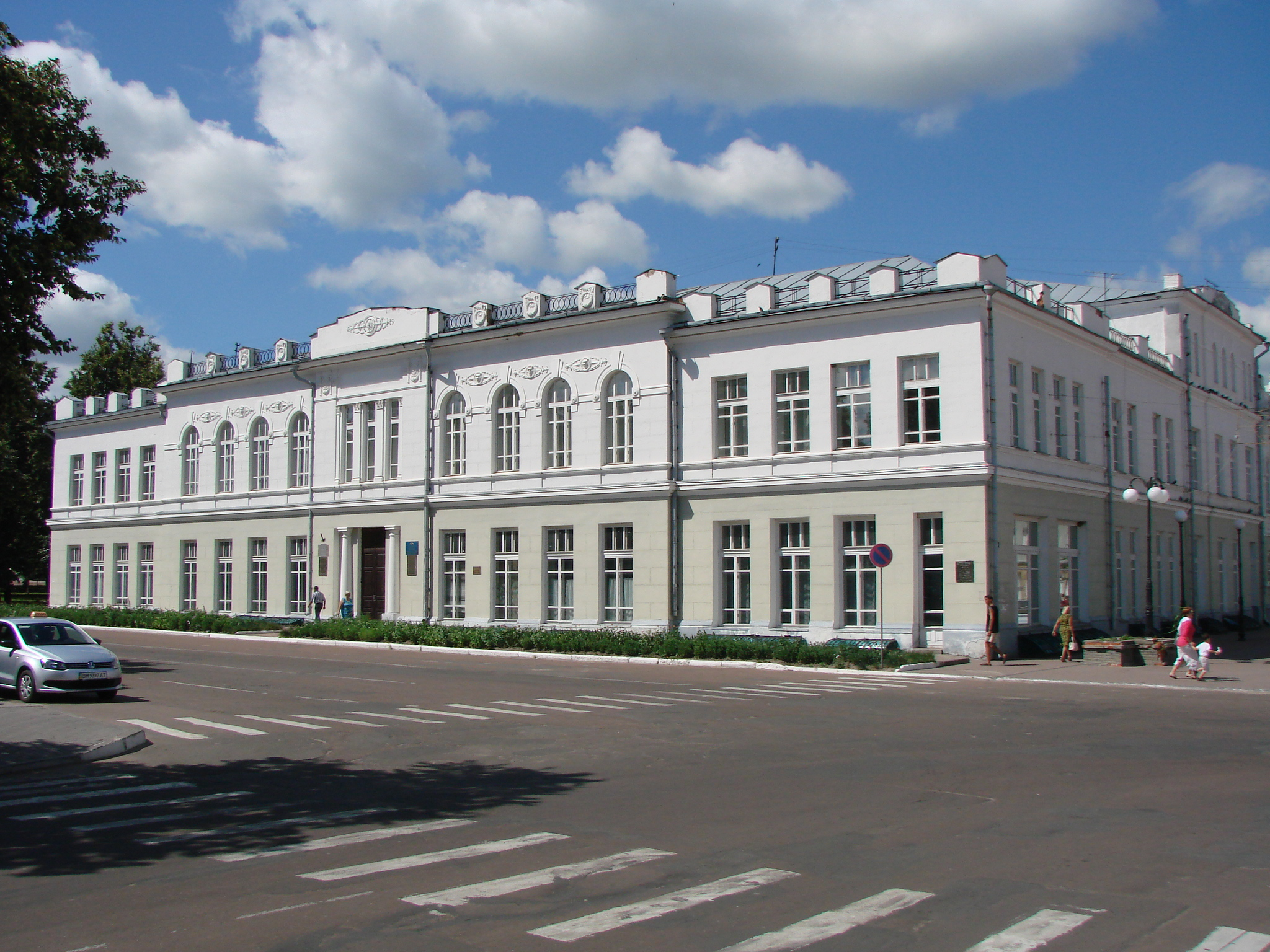
- P 65 in Hlukhiv

Route information
- Part of E38
- Length: 122.3 km (76.0 mi)
- Existed: 2008–present

Major junctions
- North end: Russian border at Mykolaivka
- South end: Russian border at Katerynivka

Location
- Country: Ukraine
- Oblasts: Chernihiv, Sumy

Highway system
- Roads in Ukraine; State Highways
← P 64	→ P 66

Road P 65 is a highway of regional significance in Ukraine. It connects two border crossings between Russia and Ukraine, "Mykolaivka" and "Katerynivka". The road passes through the Chernihiv and Sumy regions and goes across Semenivka, Novhorod-Siverskyi, Shostka and Hlukhiv.

== Whole length ==
The total length of the road, Mykolaivka–Shostka–Katerynivka, is 122.3 kilometres (76.0 mi). The section from Hlukhiv to the Russian border is part of European route E38.

== Main route ==
Route map: P 65:

Route P65
Chernihiv Oblast
Novhorod-Siverskyi Raion
Mykolaivka	T-2512 Border checkpoint with Russia	0 kilometres (0 mi)
Semenivka	T-2502	
Ivanivka		
Masheve		
Muraveinyk		
Lyzunivka		
Pecheniuhy		
Forostovychi	P 12	
Novhorod-Siverskyi		
Putyvsk		
Sumy Oblast
Shostka Raion
Pyrohivka		
Bohdanivka		
Bohdanka		
Shostka	Т-1907 Т-1908 Т-1912	
Hamaliyivka		
Makove		
Sobycheve		
Hlukhiv Raion
Slout		
Bereza	E101 / E391 / M 02 Т-1915	
Hlukhiv	E38 / P 44	
Zarutske		
Katerynivka	Border checkpoint with Russia	122.3 kilometres (76.0 mi)
