= Senkivka =

Border crossing between Ukraine, Russia and Belarus

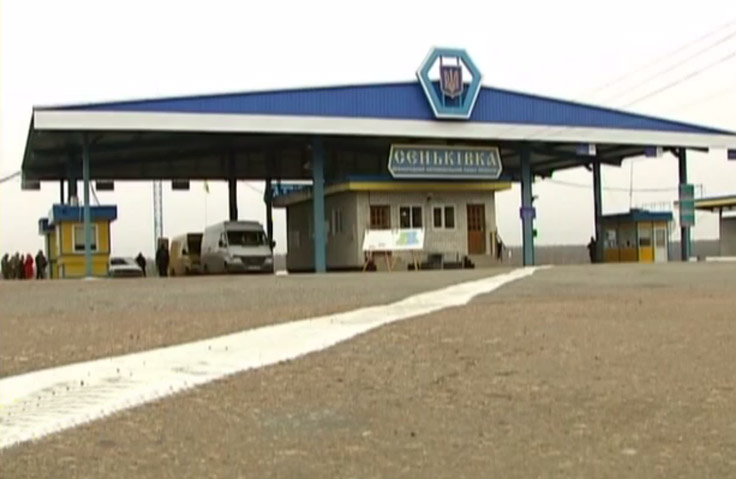
- Senkivka on 20 March 2014

Locaiton
- Country: Ukraine
- Location: outside of Senkivka, Chernihiv Raion, Chernihiv Oblast, Ukraine
- Coordinates: 52°6′22.6″N 31°46′52.9″E

Closer look of the location of 3-way border crossing

Senkivka (Ukrainian: Сеньківка) is a land three-way border crossing between Ukraine with Russia and Belarus on the Ukrainian side, just north of the village of Senkivka, in Chernihiv Raion, Chernihiv Oblast.

It is the Ukrainian side of the Novye Yurkovichi–Senkivka–Vesyalowka border tripoint.

== Overview ==
The checkpoint/crossing is situated on a P 13. Across the border on the Russian side is a border checkpoint Novye Yurkovichi located near Novye Yurkovichi (Bryansk Oblast), on the Belarusian side is a border checkpoint Vesyalowka.

The type of crossing is automobile, status - international. The types of transportation for automobile crossings are passenger and freight.

The port of entry is part of the Senkivka customs post of Chernihiv customs.

== Points of interest ==
In 1975 here was erected a stele "monument of Friendship (Three Sisters)" (Russian: монумент Дружбы ("Три сестры"), monument Druzhby ("Tri sestry"); 52.112139°N 31.781492°E) where in June every year take place several festivities among the people from the Republic of Belarus, Ukraine, and the Russian Federation. The monument is located about .5 km (0.31 mi) north of the checkpoint.

On 9 November 2012 at Senkivka was installed the first border post of the State Border of Ukraine with the Russian Federation. The first border post of the State Border of Ukraine with Belarus was installed on 13 November 2014.

In 2014 the access to the festivals through Vesyalowka and Novye Yurkovichi were closed for Ukrainian visitors.

== See also ==
- Belarus–Ukraine border
- Russia–Belarus border
- Russia–Ukraine border
- State border of Ukraine
