= Dovzhansky (border checkpoint) =

Former Russia–Ukraine border crossing

Location
- Country: Ukraine
- Location: Dovzhanske, Ukraine
- Coordinates: 47°51′30″N 39°45′17″E

Dovzhansky (Ukrainian: Довжанський) was a major land border crossing between Ukraine and Russia next to the Ukrainian village of Dovzhanske, Dovzhansk Raion.

The crossing was situated on autoroute E50 ( M 03). On the Russian side an industrial area of Novoshakhtinsk is about 7 km from the crossing.

A few hundred meters to the north of the road checkpoint was also a railway crossing point used by trains travelling between Sverdlovsk and Novoshakhtinsk.

The port of entry was "Dovzhanskiy" and had a customs checkpoint code of 70207 02 00 (11)

== War in Donbas ==
On May 14, 2014, one day after the unrecognized declaration of independence by the Lugansk People's Republic (LPR), Ukrainian border guards at the Dovzhansky border crossing arrested Valery Bolotov. 150 to 200 armed Russian-backed separatists attacked the Dovzhansky checkpoint where he had been held and freed him.

=== Closing the crossing ===
On June 5, 2014, the Cabinet of Ministers of Ukraine closed this border checkpoint and seven others (Note: Luhansk Oblast: Chervonopartyzansk – Gukovo, Russia; Chervona Mohyla – Gukovo, Russia; Novoborovtsi – Alekseyevo-Tuzlovka, Russia; Krasnodarsky – Donetsk, Russia; Krasnodarsky – Nyzhni Shvyrov, Russia; Syevyerny – Donetsk, Russia; in Donetsk Oblast: Marynivka – Kuibyshevo, Russia) (Note: Luhansk Oblast: Izvaryne - Donets, Russia, checkpoint temporarily closed by Ukrainian government on 24 June 2014. 23 September 2014, the Izvaryne railway crossing for cargo trains is open 24 hours.) on the Russia–Ukraine border. At that time, separatists in eastern Ukraine had control of the border crossing allowing weapons from Russia to pass without controls. Subsequently, on July 1, 2014, the Ukrainian army regained control of this border point, until 1 August, where daily "Grad" rocket volleys and shelling by pro-Russian forces made the Ukrainian position untenable.

== See also ==
- Russo-Ukrainian War
- Russia–Ukraine border
- State Border of Ukraine
- Highway M03 (Ukraine)
