= Terny, Sumy Oblast =

Rural locality in Sumy Oblast, Ukraine

Terny Терни
- Rural settlement
- Location within Sumy Oblast Location within Ukraine
- Coordinates: 50°59′22″N 33°58′19″E
- Country: Ukraine
- Oblast: Sumy Oblast
- Raion: Romny Raion
- Hromada: Nedryhailiv settlement hromada

Population (2022)
  - Total: 2,800
- Time zone: UTC+2 (EET)
  - Summer (DST): UTC+3 (EEST)

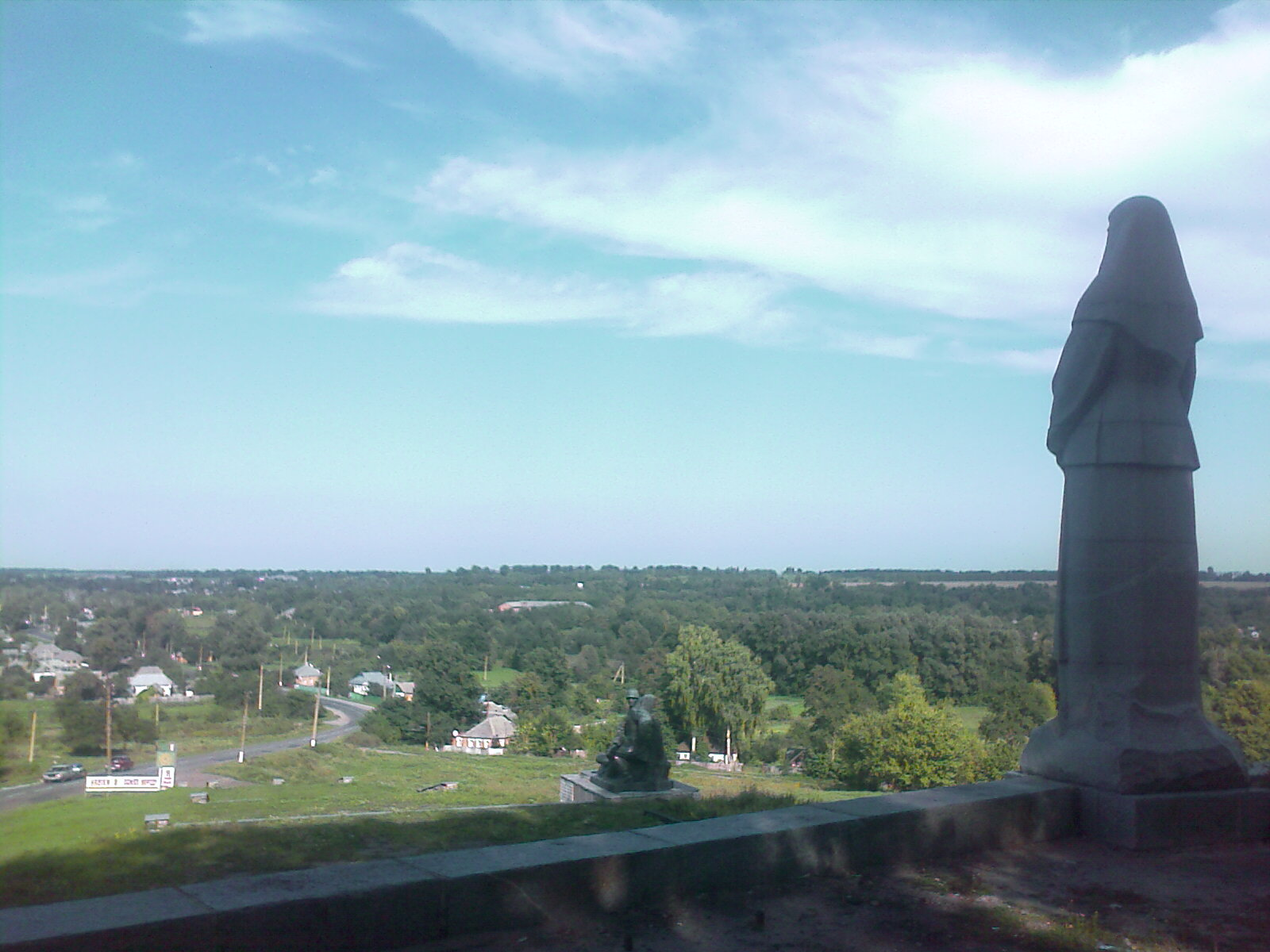
Monument in Terny

Terny (Ukrainian: Терни, Russian: Терны) is a rural settlement in Romny Raion of Sumy Oblast in Ukraine. It is located on the banks of the Tern, a tributary of the Sula in the drainage basin of the Dnieper. Terny belongs to Nedryhailiv settlement hromada, one of the hromadas of Ukraine. Population: 2,800 (2022 estimate).

== History ==
Until 18 July 2020, Terny belonged to Nedryhailiv Raion. The raion was abolished in July 2020 as part of the administrative reform of Ukraine, which reduced the number of raions of Sumy Oblast to five. The area of Nedryhailiv Raion was merged into Romny Raion.

Until 26 January 2024, Terny was designated urban-type settlement. On this day, a new law entered into force which abolished this status, and Terny became a rural settlement.

== Economy ==
=== Transportation ===
The settlement is connected by road with Sumy, Vorozhba, and Konotop, where it has access to the Highway M02 and further to Kyiv.
