= Belarus–Ukraine border =

International border

Belarusian and Ukrainian boundary markers

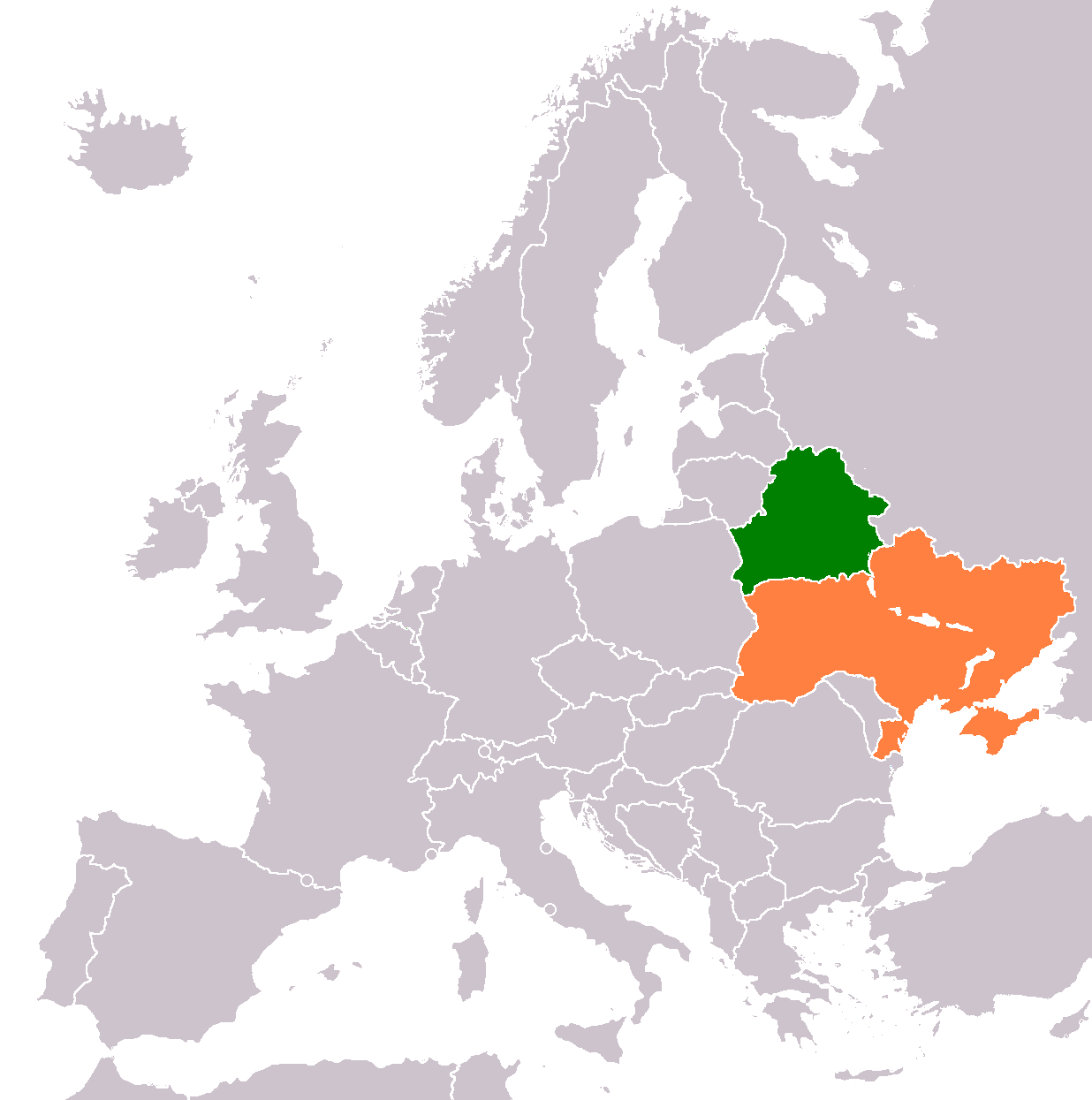
Belarus and Ukraine within Europe

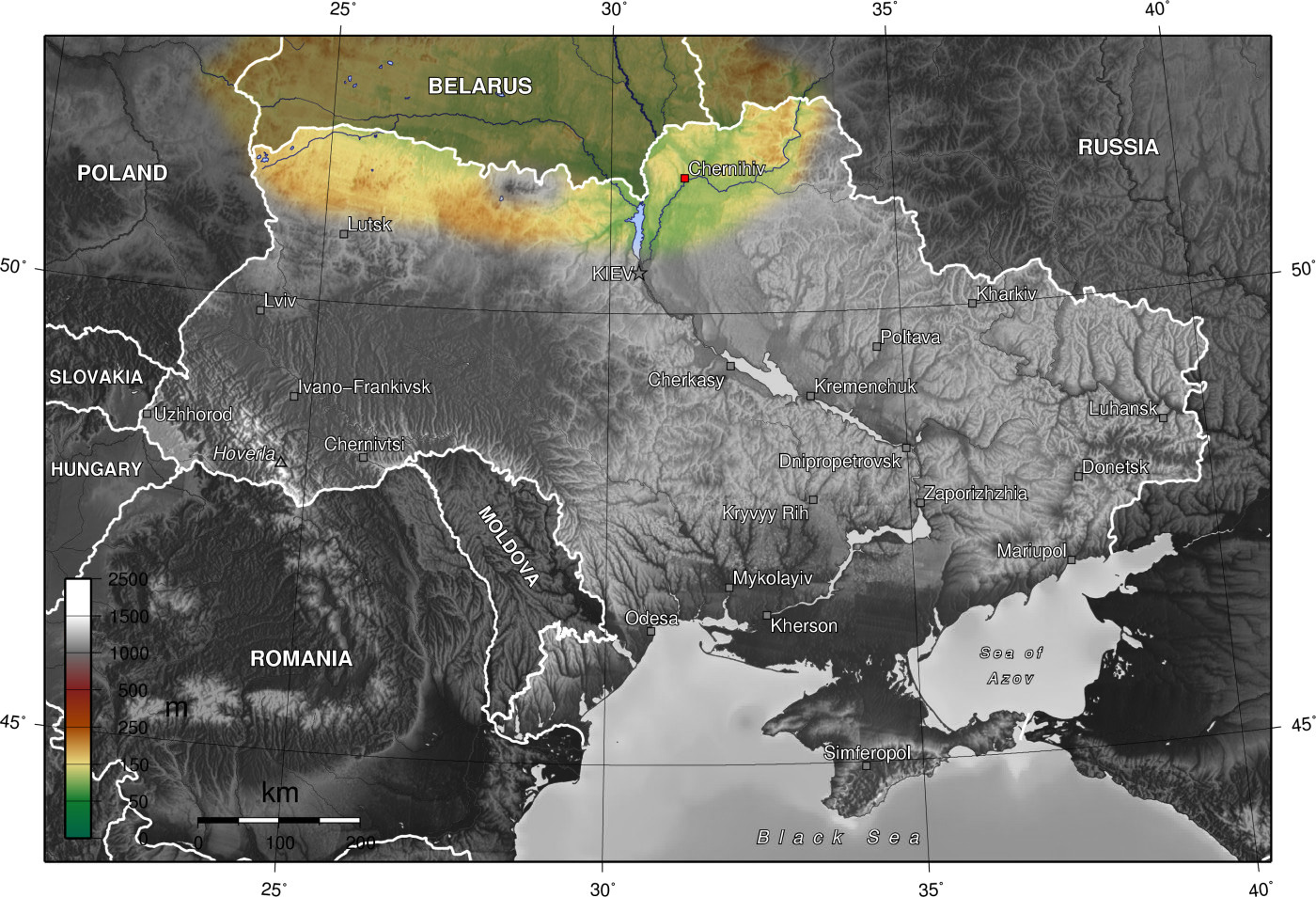
Polesian lowland

The Belarusian-Ukrainian border (Belarusian: Беларуска-ўкраінская граніца, romanized: Bielaruska-ŭkrainskaja hranica, Ukrainian: Білорусько-український кордон, romanized: Bilorus'ko-ukrajin'skyj kordon) is the state border between Belarus and Ukraine with a length of about 1,084 km (674 mi). It starts from the triple junction with Poland to the west and stretches to the triple junction with Russia to the east. The tripoint border at the triple border junction of Belarus, Russia and Ukraine is marked in the form of a monument, while at the other border junction there is a river, the Western Bug that coincides with the border of Poland.

== Geography ==
The border is situated in the Polesian Lowland, which stretches approximately from the Western Bug to the Dnieper along the Pripyat River.

The western end of the border starts at the Western Bug, around the area of the Shatsky Lakes, and runs eastward across the Pinsk Marshes. Further along, it stretches parallel to the south of the Pripyat River, passing densely wooded areas that were contaminated after the Chernobyl disaster. The border passes just to the north of Pripyat city and then turns southeast with the river and continues to run parallel to it. As the border reaches the Dnieper River, it turns north towards Homiel and runs along the river. At the midpoint between Homiel and Ripky, the border turns and again runs eastward towards the Central Russian Upland for about 100 km (62 mi) where it terminates at the triple junction point with the Russian border.

== History ==
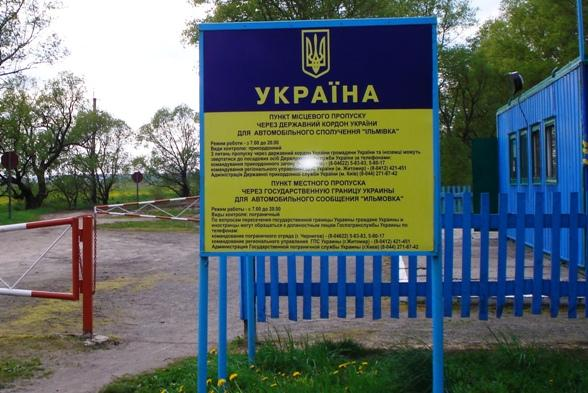
Sign at Ilmivka checkpoint (local border traffic) written in Ukrainian and Russian

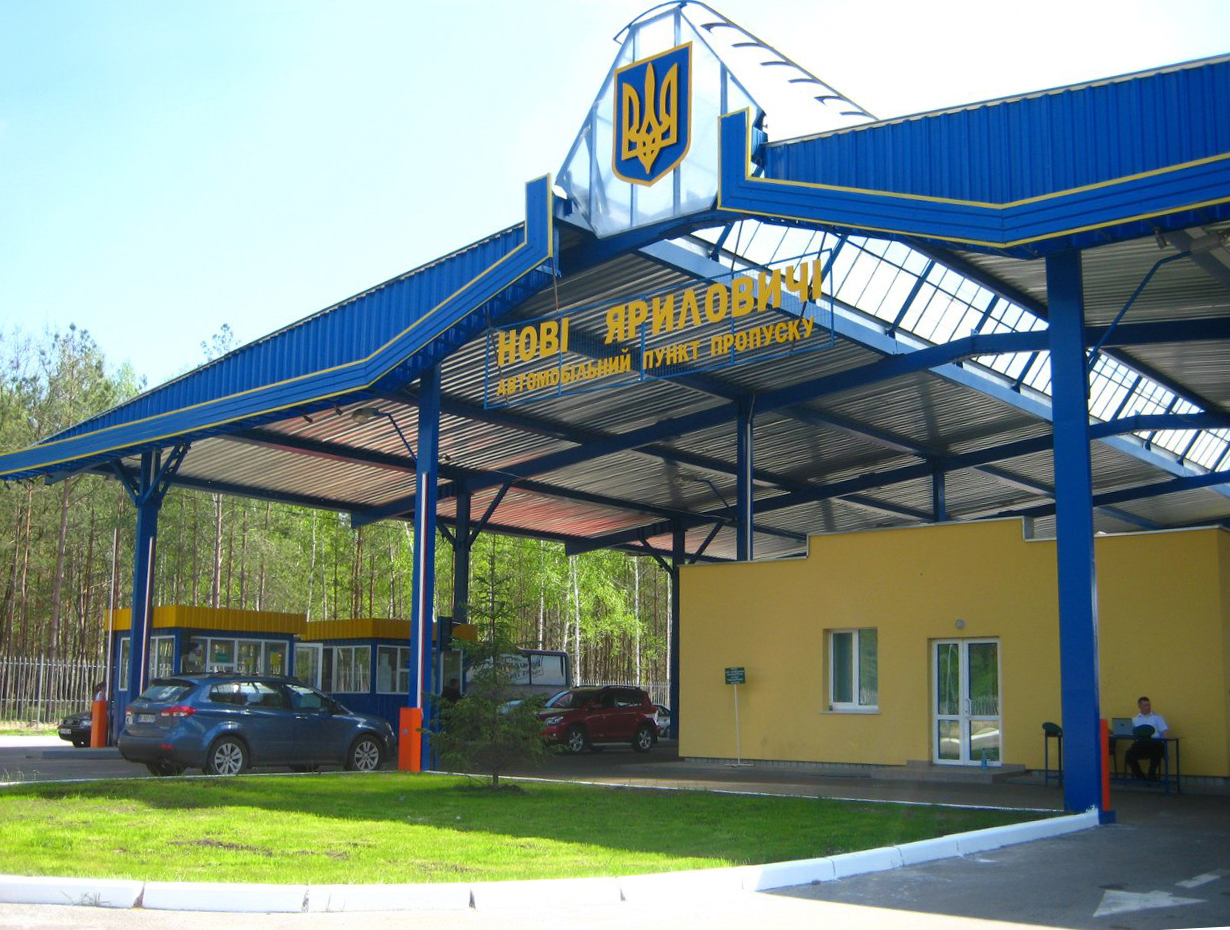
Novi Yarylovychi

The modern state of the border is dated to World War I, when the Ukrainian People's Republic appeared on the map of the world in 1918.

However, the border has historical roots. The border between the Grand Duchy of Lithuania and the Kingdom of Poland under the Union of Lublin was similar. It corresponded to the administrative border of Brest-Litovsk and Minsk voivodeship on the Lithuanian side and Kyiv Voivodeship, Volhynian, and Ruthenian voivodeships on the Polish side.

After World War I and the treaty of Riga, the western portion of the border roughly coincided with the administrative border of the Polesia and Volyn provinces of the interwar Polish Republic, and the eastern portion coincided with the border between the Soviet republics of Belarus and Ukraine.

At first, the border between both Soviet republics was recognised by the Treaty between the Ukrainian SSR and the Belarusian SSR from December 12, 1990.

The status of the state border with Ukraine was given by the Supreme Soviet of Belarus of 11 June 1993, but there is an international agreement between Belarus and Ukraine, in which they mutually recognise the border BSSR and USSR recognised in 1990.

To date, the border is governed by the Agreement between Belarus and Ukraine on friendship, good neighbourliness and cooperation of 17 June 1995, the Treaty on the State Border between Belarus and Ukraine on 12 May 1997 in the same year was ratified by the Verkhovna Rada of Ukraine, and in 2010 the National Assembly of Belarus, but the parties still have not exchanged instruments of ratification.

According to Chairman of the State Border Committee of Belarus, Igor Raczkowski, work on border demarcation may continue for up to 10 years and require 51 billion rubels.

Demarcation of the border began with the 13 November 2013 inauguration of the first border sign at the place where the borders of Ukraine, Belarus and Russia meet.

Following the Chernobyl disaster in 1986, a big portion of the Ukrainian side of the border lies with the so-called Chernobyl Exclusion Zone and Polesie State Radioecological Reserve (Belarusian side). The Chernobyl Exclusion Zone in Ukraine is governed by the Ministry of Ecology and Natural Resources through its special agency. The area does not have adequate infrastructure for border crossing, which is conducted in the area under special authority due to contamination. The exclusion zone has its own checkpoints. The Chernihiv–Ovruch railway runs along the border on the Ukrainian side, connecting the abandoned Chernobyl Nuclear Power Plant with the city of Slavutych. The tracks cross the border twice.

On 24 February 2022, during the 2022 Russian invasion of Ukraine, Russian troops began moving across the border from Belarus into Ukraine as a part of the Kyiv offensive. On 3 April 2022 Ukrainian troops took back control of sections of the border near Pripyat (they had lost control of due to the Russian invasion). The day before the whole of Kyiv Oblast, which is located on the Belarus–Ukraine border, was declared free of invaders by the Ukrainian Ministry of Defense after Russian troops had left the area. On 4 and 5 April 2022 units of the State Border Guard Service of Ukraine retook control of their border crossing in Chernihiv Oblast.

On 11 November, it was reported that Ukraine had begun construction of a wall on the border with Belarus.

After the June 2023 Wagner Group rebellion, after which the Wagner Group was slated to move to Belarus, the border again became a topic of discussion. On 30 June 2023, Ukrainian President Volodymyr Zelenskyy approved plans for further reinforcements of the border, although they acknowledged that they did not find any current threats.

== Border checkpoints ==
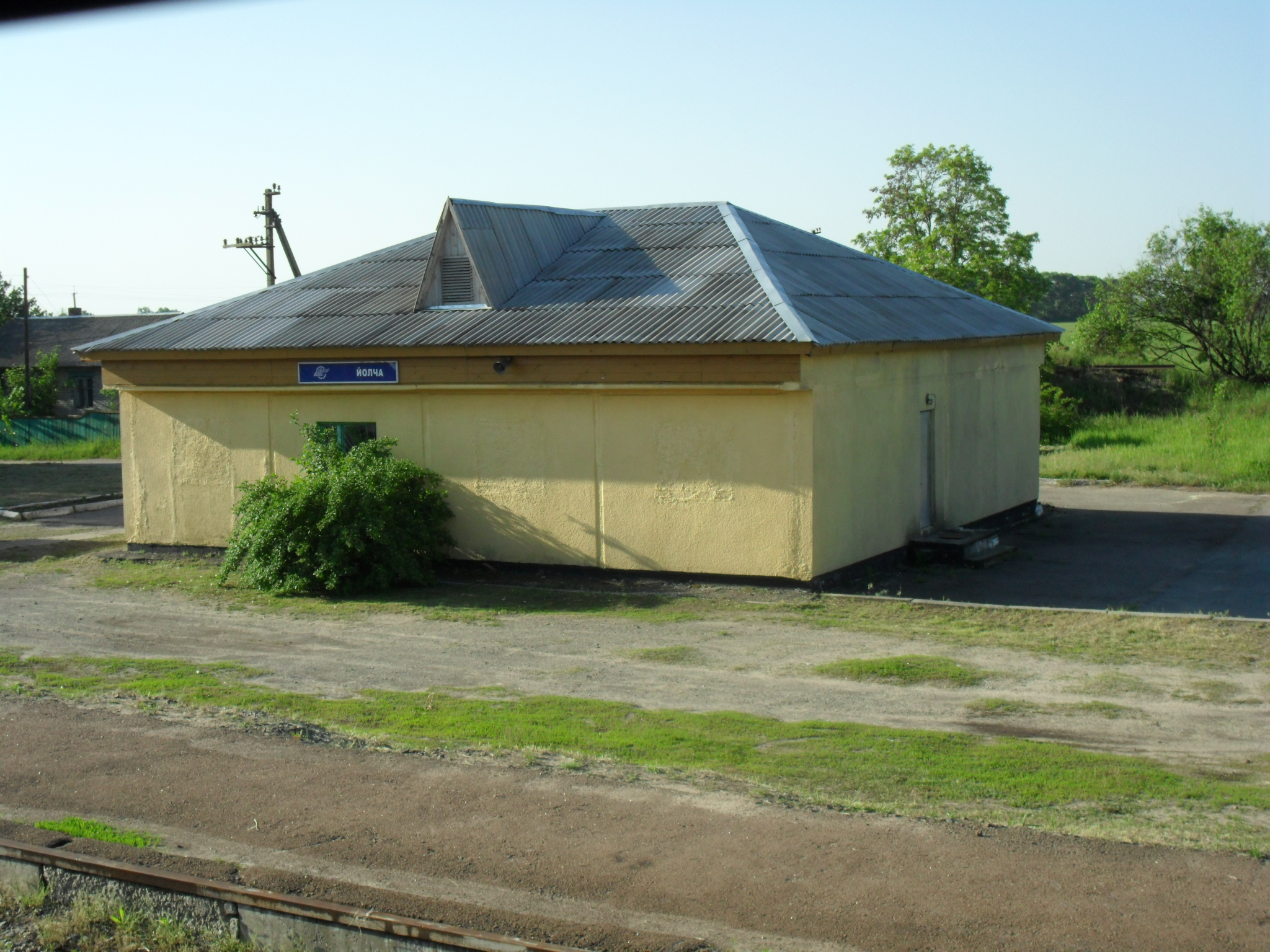
Iolcha train station

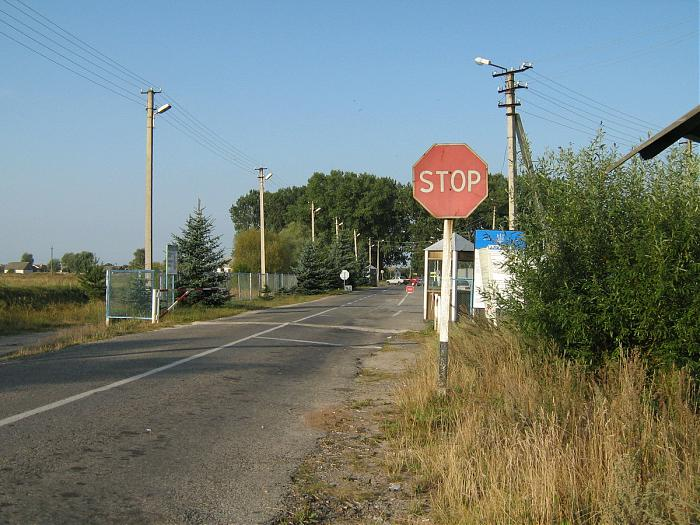
Pishcha border crossing

All border crossings between Belarus and Ukraine are closed as of October 30, 2024.

Checkpoints in bold used to have international status.

=== Homiel – Chernihiv regions ===
- Loyew – Kamianka (river, in winter – ice crossing)
- Andzewka – Derevyny (small road/street, local traffic passengers during day hours)
- Paddabranka – Dobryanka (small road/street, local traffic passengers during day hours)
- Hlybotskaie – Ilmivka (small road/street, local traffic passengers during day hours)
- **Kamaryn** – **Slavutych** **P35**/ P 56
- **Vesialowka** – **Senkivka** **P124**/ P 13
- **Novaja Huta** – **Novi Yarylovychi** / M 01 ( E95)
- **Cierucha** – **Hornostayivka** (railway) (**Chernihiv** (railway, f))
- **Cierachowka** – **Khorobychi** (railway) (**Shchors** (railway))

=== Homiel – Kyiv regions ===
- (S) Aliaksandrawka – Vilcha **P37**/T1035 (within Chernobyl zone)

=== Homiel – Zhytomyr regions ===
- (S) Hluškavičy – Maidan Kopyshchansky **P36**/T0605
- **Novaja Rudnia** – **Vystupovychi** **P31**/ P 28 (within Chernobyl zone)
- **Slavečna** – **Vystupovychi** (railway, within Chernobyl zone) (**Ovruch** (railway) and **Korosten** (railway))

=== Bresc – Rivne regions ===
- Trušava – Vychivka (small road/street, local traffic passengers during day hours)
- Almany – Perebrody (small road/street, local traffic passengers during day hours)
- (S) Nievieĺ – Prykladnyky **P147**/ P 76
- **Vierchni Cierabiažow** – **Horodyshche** **P88**/ P 05
- **Haryń** – **Udrytsk** (railway) (**Sarny** (railway))

=== Bresc – Volyn regions ===
- Očyna – Huta (small road/street, local traffic passengers during day hours)
- Sušytnica – Tur (small road/street, local traffic passengers during day hours)
- Dubok – Khrypsk (small road/street, local traffic passengers during day hours)
- (S) Dzivin – Samary **P127**/local road
- **Tamašowka** – **Pulemets** **P94**/T0307 – (S) Oltuš – Pishcha **P17**/T0307 (Shatsky Lakes area)
- **Machro** – **Dolsk** **P144**/ P 14
- **Makrany** – **Domanove** / M 19 ( E85) and T0304
- **Chacislaw** – **Zabolottia** (railway) (**Kovel** (railway, freight))

=== Special case (Chernobyl railway) ===
Chernihiv–Ovruch railway is used by Ukrzaliznytsia only. The railway passes through a number of stations on Belarusian territory, most of which are abandoned, except for that of Iolcha. Iolcha station is leased by the government of Ukraine and operated by Ukrainian personnel, while the border services (such as customs) are conducted by the Belarusian authorities. Border services on Ukrainian territory are also conducted at Semykhody station, Vyshhorod Raion (near Pripyat) and Nedanchychi, Chernihiv Raion (near Slavutych). The portion of the line between Semykhody and Ovruch has been suspended indefinitely and is not currently being utilised.
