= P45 road (Ukraine) =

Road in Ukraine

Road P45
- Автошлях Р45

Route information
- Length: 108.3 km (67.3 mi)

Major junctions
- North end: H 07 / H 12 in Sumy
- South end: P46 in Bohodukhiv

Location
- Country: Ukraine
- Oblasts: Sumy, Kharkiv

Highway system
- Roads in Ukraine; State Highways
← P 44	→ P 46

P45 is a regional Ukraine road (P-highway) in Sumy Oblast and Kharkiv Oblast, Ukraine, running mainly north-south and connecting Sumy with Bohodukhiv in sloped line. It begins in Sumy at Bandera Street (Highway H07/Highway P61) and Illinska Street, and travels straight through central Sumy. It passes through Verkhnya Syrovatka, Stinka, Hlybne, Samotoivka, Krasnopillya, Zemlyane, Mezenivka, Slavhorod, Porozok, Pozhnya, Druzhba, Shurove, Shyrokyi Bereh, Vilne, Velyka Pysarivka, Rozsoshi, Vinnytski Ivany, Leskivka, before terminating in Bohodukhiv at Tretyakivska Street (Highway P46) and Kharkivska Street.

== Main route ==
Province	Municipality	km	mi	Exit	Destinations	Notes
Sumy Oblast	Sumy Raion	0.0	0.0		T-19-01 T-19-09 P61 H 07 H 12 - Sumy	
Sumy Oblast	Sumy Raion				H 12 - Verkhnya Syrovatka	
Sumy Oblast	Sumy Raion				Stinka	
Sumy Oblast	Krasnopillia Raion				T-19-01 - Hlybne	
Sumy Oblast	Krasnopillia Raion				Samotoivka	
Sumy Oblast	Krasnopillia Raion				Krasnopillia	
Sumy Oblast	Krasnopillia Raion				Zemlyane	
Sumy Oblast	Krasnopillia Raion				T-19-13 - Mezenivka	
Sumy Oblast	Krasnopillia Raion				Slavhorod	
Sumy Oblast	Krasnopillia Raion				Porozok	
Sumy Oblast	Velyka Pysarivka Raion				Pozhnya	
Sumy Oblast	Velyka Pysarivka Raion				Druzhba	
Sumy Oblast	Velyka Pysarivka Raion				Shurove	
Sumy Oblast	Velyka Pysarivka Raion				Shyrokyi Bereh	
Sumy Oblast	Velyka Pysarivka Raion				Vilne	
Sumy Oblast	Velyka Pysarivka Raion				T-17-05 - Velyka Pysarivka	
Sumy Oblast	Velyka Pysarivka Raion				Rozsoshi	
Kharkiv Oblast	Bohodukhiv Raion				Vinnytski Ivany	
Kharkiv Oblast	Bohodukhiv Raion				Dehtyary	
Kharkiv Oblast	Bohodukhiv Raion				Leskivka	
Kharkiv Oblast	Bohodukhiv Raion	108.3	67.3		T-17-01 P46 - Bohodukhiv	
1.000 mi = 1.609 km; 1.000 km = 0.621 mi

== See also ==
- Roads in Ukraine
- Ukraine State Highways
