= Highway H28 (Ukraine) =

Highway in Ukraine

Highway H28
- Автошлях Н28

Route information
- Length: 71.4 km (44.4 mi)
- Existed: 9 August 2017–present

Major junctions
- south end: M 01 in Chernihiv
- north end: Belarusian border at Senkivka

Location
- Country: Ukraine
- Oblasts: Chernihiv

Highway system
- Roads in Ukraine; State Highways

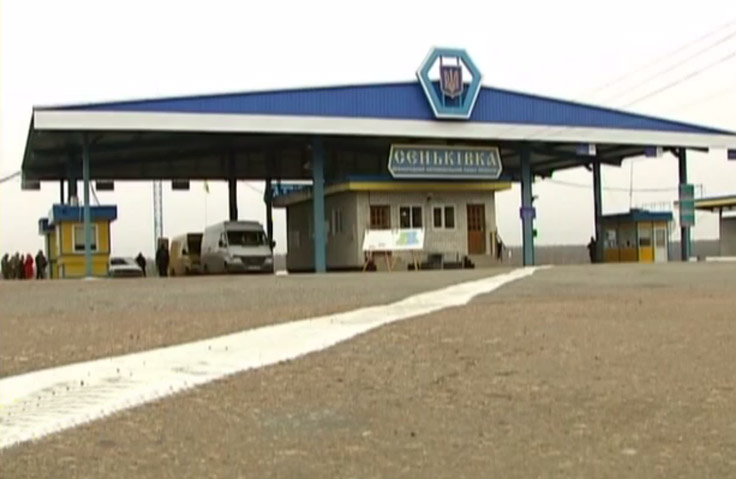
Senkivka border crossing

H28 is a national road (H-Highway) in Chernihiv Oblast, Ukraine. It runs north–south and connected Chernihiv with a tri-side border. Before 2017, H28 was numbered as P13.

== Main route ==
Main route and connections to/intersections with other highways in Ukraine.

The road passes through many small populated places, among which the most notable are two former Cossack towns of Chernihiv Regiment Sedniv, a former estate of Lyzohub family, and Horodnia. Another former Cossack town, today is a small village of Kyselivka. Since 2009 in Sedniv exists a historical preserve Lyzohub Estate (Sadyba Lyzohubiv).

During the Soviet occupation, many villages in the region suffered from the Soviet policy of so-called "black boards" which contributed to Holodomor.

=== Intersections ===
In Chernihiv, the road connects to the major transportation corridor M01. In Kyselivka it intersects the P12 (Chernihiv – Novhorod-Siverskyi). Through Senivka in Belarus the road continues onto Belarusian road P124, and in Russia the continues onto Russian road M13.

== See also ==
- Roads in Ukraine
