= P44 (classification) =

Modern pentathlon disability classification

P44 is a Modern pentathlon classification. Sportspeople in this class include people with amputations.

== Disability types ==
This class includes people with several disability types include amputations.

=== Amputee ===
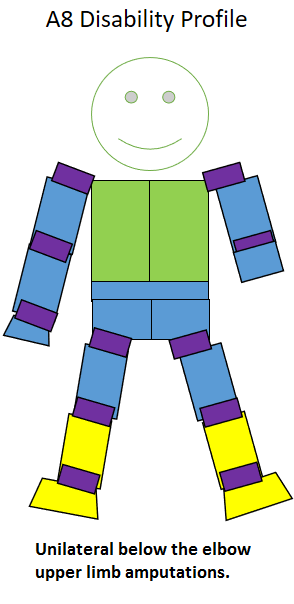
Type of amputation for an A8 classified sportsperson.

ISOD A4 sportspeople are eligible for this class. Shank length for people in this class is not uniform, with competitors having different lengths of leg found below their knee. People in this class use a prosthetic limb when competing in athletics. It has three parts: a socket, a shank and a foot. People in this class can use standard starting blocks because their amputation generally allows for the use of a standard starting position. Use of a specially made carbon fibre running prosthetic leg assists runners in this class in lowering their heart rate compared to using a prosthetic not designed for running. Runners in this class can have lower metabolic costs compared to elite runners over middle and long distances.

Inside the class, shank length does not impact the distance that male long jumpers can jump.

== Getting classified ==
Classification generally has four phase. The first stage of classification is a health examination. For amputees in this class, this is often done on site at a sports training facility or competition. The second stage is observation in practice, the third stage is observation in competition and the last stage is assigning the sportsperson to a relevant class. Sometimes the health examination may not be done on site for amputees in this class because the nature of the amputation could cause not physically visible alterations to the body.
