= Highway H07 (Ukraine) =

Highway in Ukraine

Highway H07
- Автошлях Н07
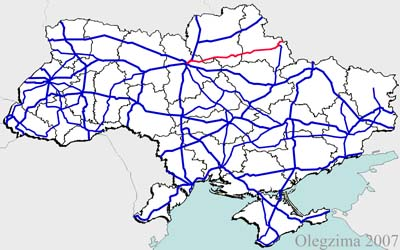

Route information
- Length: 334.7 km (208.0 mi)

Major junctions
- West end: M 01 in Brovary
- East end: Russian border near Yunakivka

Location
- Country: Ukraine
- Oblasts: Kyiv, Chernihiv, Sumy

Highway system
- Roads in Ukraine; State Highways
← H 06	→ H 08

H07 is an important Ukraine national highway (H-highway) in Kyiv, Chernihiv, and Sumy Oblasts, Ukraine, running mainly west-east, and connecting Kyiv (if switching to another highway at Brovary) with Yunakivka in a more or less straight line. It begins in Brovary at Highway M01/Highway E95, and passes through Krasylivka, Hoholiv, Rusaniv, Peremoha, Nova Basan, Novyi Bykiv, Pohreby, Rudivka, Pryluky, Okhyrky, Sribne, Kharkove, Lavirkove, Romny, Korovyntsi, Nedryhailiv, Vylshana, Komyshanka, Shtepivka, Sula, Sad, Sumy, Stetskivka, Pysarivka, and Yunakivka, before ending at the Russian border. The road then continues as the R200 to Kursk.

== Accessibility ==
Marshrutkas from Kyiv to Sumy actually prefer to first travel by means of Highway M03, then turning onto the P60 at Pyryatyn, and only then turning onto Highway H07 in Romny. The same stands for marshrutkas from Sumy to Kyiv. The reason is that on this route there are more rest stops for marshrutkas (in Boryspil, Pyryatyn, Lokhvytsya, Romny, and Nedryhailiv) than on Highway H07 (there are none before Romny except in Pryluky, but that poses a minor detour).

== Main route ==
Main route and intersections with other highways in Ukraine:

Marker	Settlements with intersecting highways	Notes	Highway interchanges
0 km	Brovary		M 01 / E95
	Hoholiv		T-10-04
	Novyi Bykiv		T-25-41
	Zaizd (near Pryluky)		P67
	Bileshchyna (near Pryluky)		T-25-24
	Sribne		T-25-30
	Romny		T-19-13 P60
	Nedryhailiv		T-19-04
	Shtepivka		T-19-06
	Sumy		P44 P45 P61 H 12
	Yunakivka / Border (Russia)		(Russia) R 200

== See also ==
- Roads in Ukraine
- Ukraine State Highways
