= Novi Yarylovychi (border checkpoint) =

Belarus and Ukraine border crossing

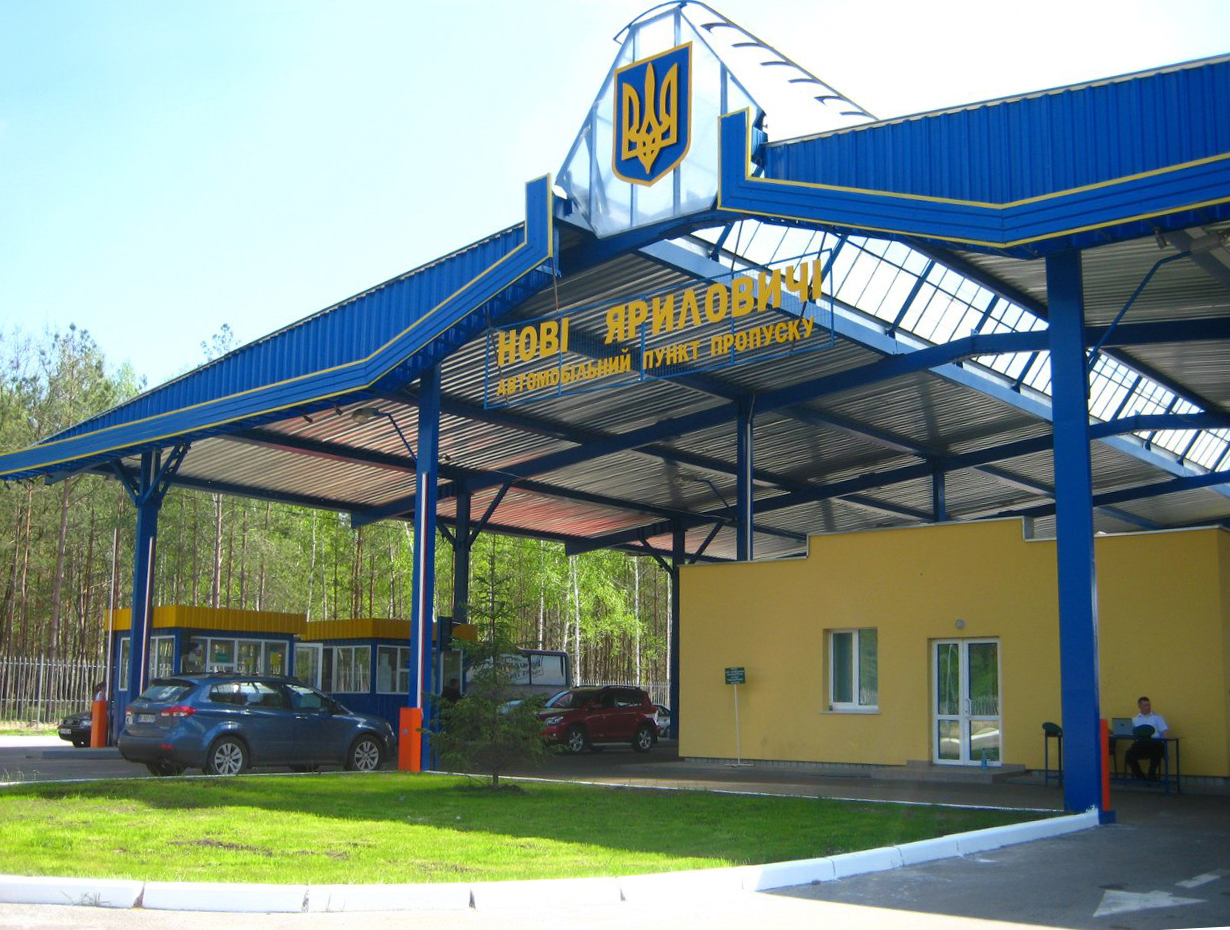

Locaiton
- Country: Ukraine
- Location: outside of Novi Yarylovychi, Chernihiv Raion, Chernihiv Oblast
- Coordinates: 52°4′28″N 30°58′10″E

Novi Yarylovychi (Ukrainian: Нові Яриловичі) is situated on the border crossing between Belarus and Ukraine, just north of the village of Novi Yarylovychi, Chernihiv Raion, Chernihiv Oblast.

== See also ==
- State border of Ukraine
