= P44 road (Ukraine) =

Road in Ukraine

Road P44
- Автошлях Р44

Route information
- Length: 131 km (81 mi)

Major junctions
- Southeast end: P 45 / P 61 in Sumy
- Northwest end: M 02 in Hlukhiv

Location
- Country: Ukraine
- Oblasts: Sumy

Highway system
- Roads in Ukraine; State Highways
← P 43	→ P 45

P44 is a regional road (P-highway) in Sumy Oblast, Ukraine, half of it running mainly north-south and the other half at an angle. It connects Hlukhiv with Sumy. It begins at Highway P61 and Bilopilskiy Shlyakh in Sumy and passes through Postolne, Syniak, Barylo, Peremoha, Bilopillia, Vorozhba, Pisky, Klepaly, Ihorivka, Chumakove, Zinove, Putyvl, Bobyne, Vyazenka, Banychi, and Peremoha, and ends in Hlukhiv at the intersection of Tereshchenkiv Street and Kyiv Street (European route E38).

== Main route ==
Main route and intersections with other highways in Ukraine.

Marker	Settlements with intersecting highways	Notes	Highway Interchanges
0 km	Sumy		P45 P61
	Bilopillia		T-19-04 T-19-06
	Chumakove		T-19-10
	Putyvl		T-19-11
131.0 km	Hlukhiv		E38

== See also ==
- Roads in Ukraine
- Ukraine State Highways
