= Trosna =

Set index of articles associated with the same name

Trosna (Russian: Тросна) is the name of several rural localities in Russia:

- Trosna, Bryansk Oblast, a settlement in Trosnyansky Selsoviet of Zhukovsky District of Bryansk Oblast
- Trosna, Khvastovichsky District, Kaluga Oblast, a village in Khvastovichsky District, Kaluga Oblast
- Trosna, Sukhinichsky District, Kaluga Oblast, a village in Sukhinichsky District, Kaluga Oblast
- Trosna, Bolkhovsky District, Oryol Oblast, a village in Bagrinovsky Selsoviet of Bolkhovsky District of Oryol Oblast
- Trosna, Trosnyansky District, Oryol Oblast, a selo in Trosnyansky Selsoviet of Trosnyansky District of Oryol Oblast
- Trosna, Chernsky District, Tula Oblast, a village in Novopokrovskaya Rural Administration of Chernsky District of Tula Oblast
- Trosna, Yefremovsky District, Tula Oblast, a village in Oktyabrsky Rural Okrug of Yefremovsky District of Tula Oblast
