= Highway M01 (Ukraine) =

Highway in Ukraine

Highway M01
- Автошлях М01
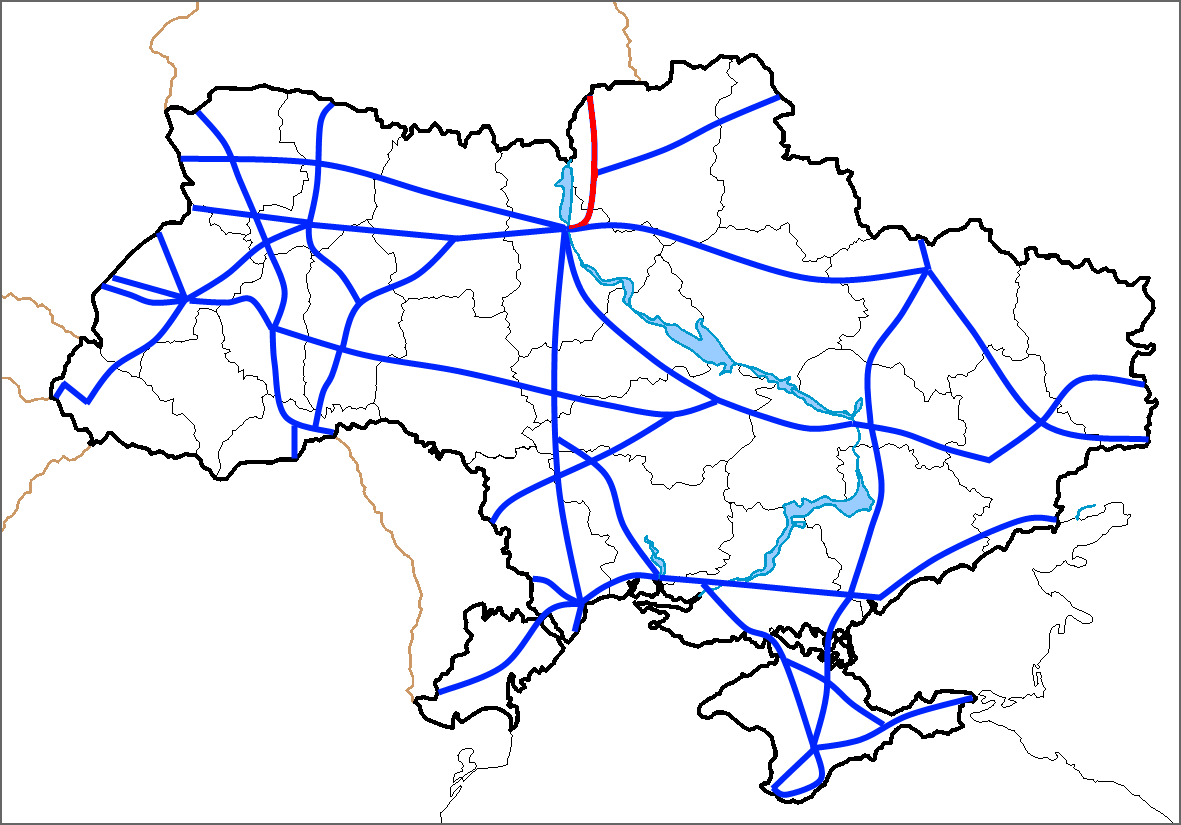

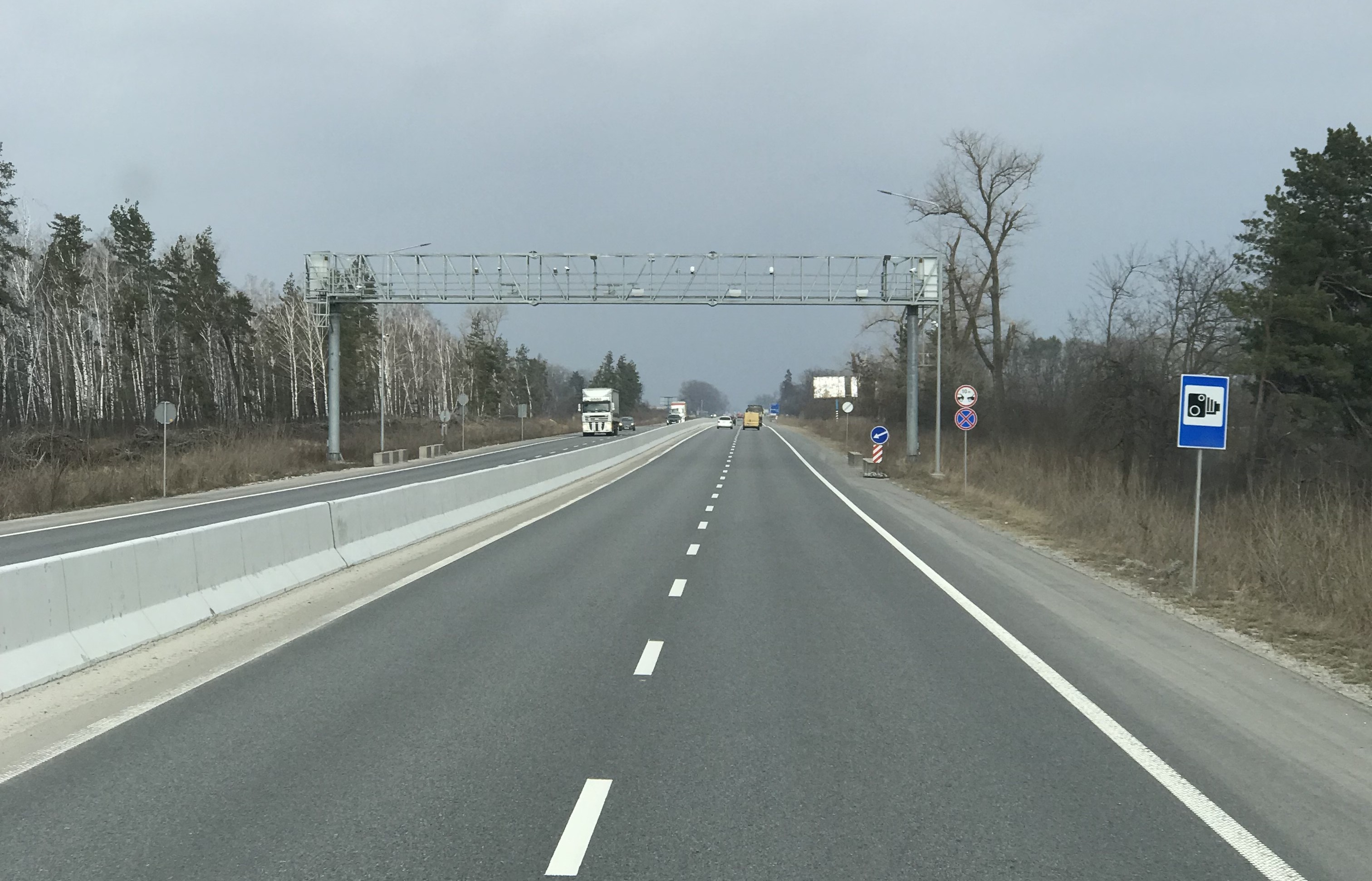
- M01 in Chernihiv Oblast

Route information
- Part of E95 / E101
- Length: 205.6 km (127.8 mi) 224.4 km (139.4 mi) with access roads

Major junctions
- South end: Akademika Zabolotnoho Avenue and Akademika Hlushkova Avenue in Kyiv
- North end: "Novi Yarylovychi" checkpoint at the Belarusian border

Location
- Country: Ukraine
- Oblasts: Kyiv City, Kyiv, Chernihiv

Highway system
- Roads in Ukraine; State Highways
→ M 02

M01 is a Ukrainian international highway (M-highway) that stretches from the state capital, Kyiv, to the northern border with Belarus.

Together with the M05 it is a part of the European routes E95 (Saint Petersburg – Kyiv – Odesa … Samsun – Merzifon) and the Trans-European transportation corridor IX. Also together with the M02 it is part of E101 (Kyiv – Moscow).

== Route / Junctions ==
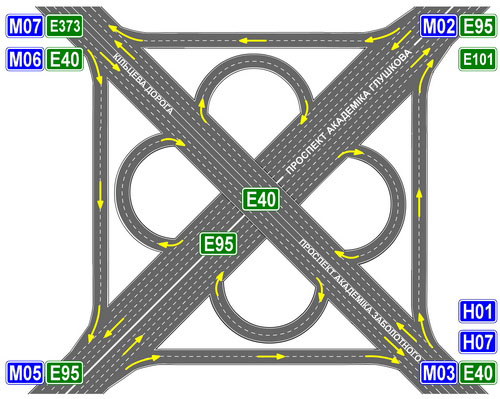
The start intersection is mistakenly identified here as M02 E95 E101 (upper-right corner).

M 01 is 205.6 km (127.8 mi) long going in the north-south direction. Its southern end is in Kyiv at intersection of Academician Hlushkov Parkway (Akademika Hlushkova Avenue) and Academician Zabolotny Parkway (Akademika Zabolotnoho Avenue).

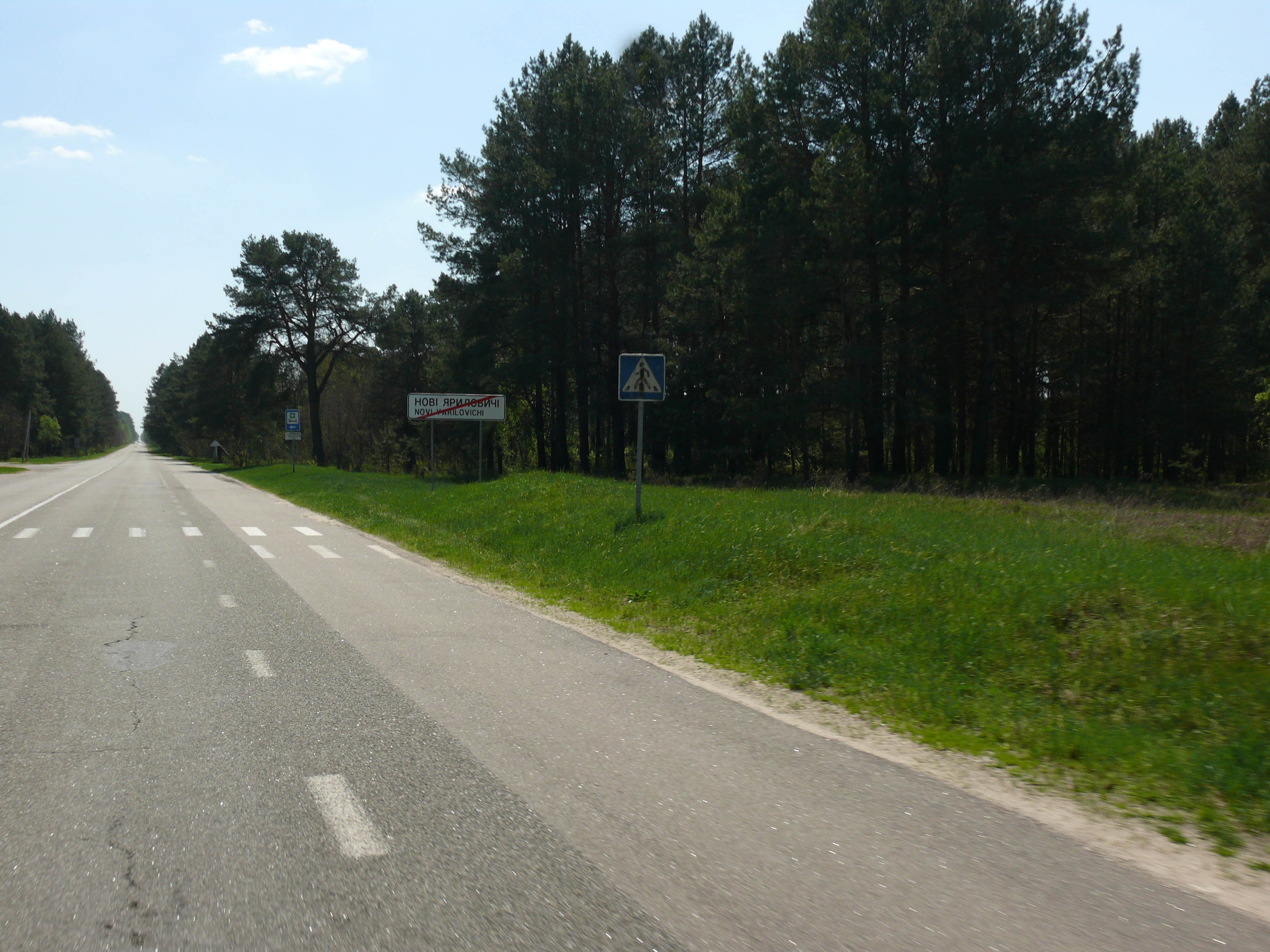
M 01 road exiting Novi Yarylovychi

The intersection connects M 01 with M 05 which combine route E95 within Ukraine. Coming through the city of Kyiv it crosses Dnipro at Paton's bridge and continuing towards Brovary Parkway by Voziednannya Parkway. Coming from there the highway goes around Brovary (one branch goes through the city and rejoins the route), then goes around Kozelets crossing a river and continuing north. Not far north from Kozelets E101 splits north of Kipti traveling east by Highway M 02, while M 01 continues north towards Chernihiv. Near village of Yahidne, south of Chernihiv, M 01 spurs with one branch and E95 going west and then north around Chernihiv crossing another river; and second branch continues without deviation through the city, crossing the same river as the main route and after 13.7 km rejoins it north of Chernihiv. Shortly after Chernihiv M 01 goes right through the village of Ripky with numerous private homes located close to the road. After Ripky the next important settlement is Novi Yarylovychi that is located just south of the border with Belarus. The border, however, is located about 10 kilometres (6 mi) north of the settlement past the village of Skytok. The section from Kyiv to Chernihiv is a dual carriageway, from Chernihiv it continues as a single carriageway.

Highway M01
Marker	Main settlements	Notes	Highway Interchanges
Kyiv City
0 km	Kyiv		Brovarskyi prospect (follows) (Streets in Kyiv)
Kyiv Oblast
22 km	Brovary – Kalynivka	splits (Note: city route (Kyivska vulytsia – Kalynivka) • detour route)	P 03 • T1026 • H 07
	Skybyn	northern side	T1034
	Semypolky	southern side	T1004
Chernihiv Oblast
	Kozelets		T2535
	Lemeshi	runs through	
91 km	Kipti	runs through	E101 M 02 • T1008
	Topchiyivka		Txxxx
128 km	Chernihiv – Yahidne	splits (Note: city route (prospekt Myru – Desna River – Kolychivka – Ivanivka) • detour route (Desna River – Kyinka – Trysviatska Sloboda – Koshivka))	P 67 • P 56 • P 69 • P 12 • T2522 • T2506
164 km	Ripky	runs through	T2512 • T2537
206 km	Novi Yarylovychi	Belarus-Ukraine border	E95(M8) (Belarus)

== Repairs ==
Repairs to the highway in Ukraine have started in 2007 and are planned to be finished before UEFA Euro 2012.

== See also ==
- Ukraine Highways
- International E-road network
- Pan-European corridors
