= Highway M02 (Ukraine) =

Highway in Ukraine

Highway M02
- Автошлях М02
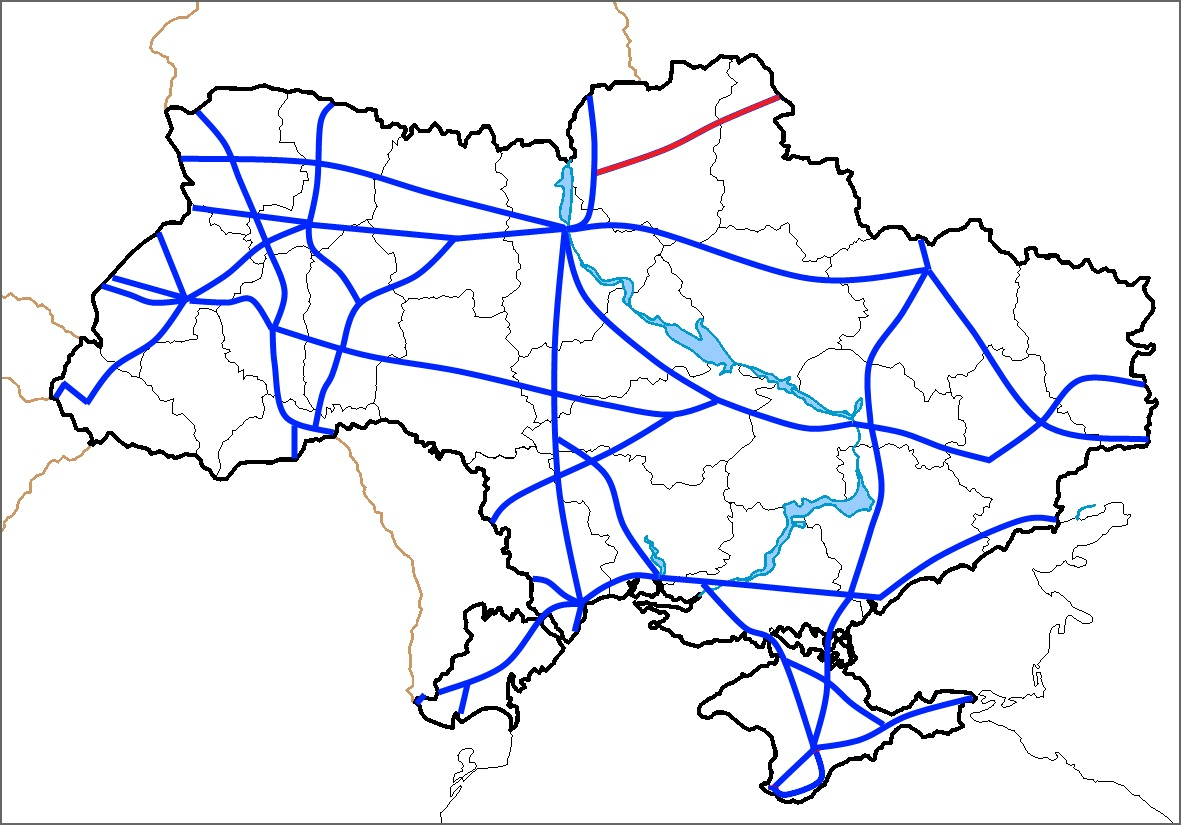

Route information
- Part of E101 E391
- Length: 242.5 km (150.7 mi)

Major junctions
- West end: M 01 near Kipti
- East end: Russian border at Bachivsk

Location
- Country: Ukraine
- Oblasts: Chernihiv, Sumy

Highway system
- Roads in Ukraine; State Highways

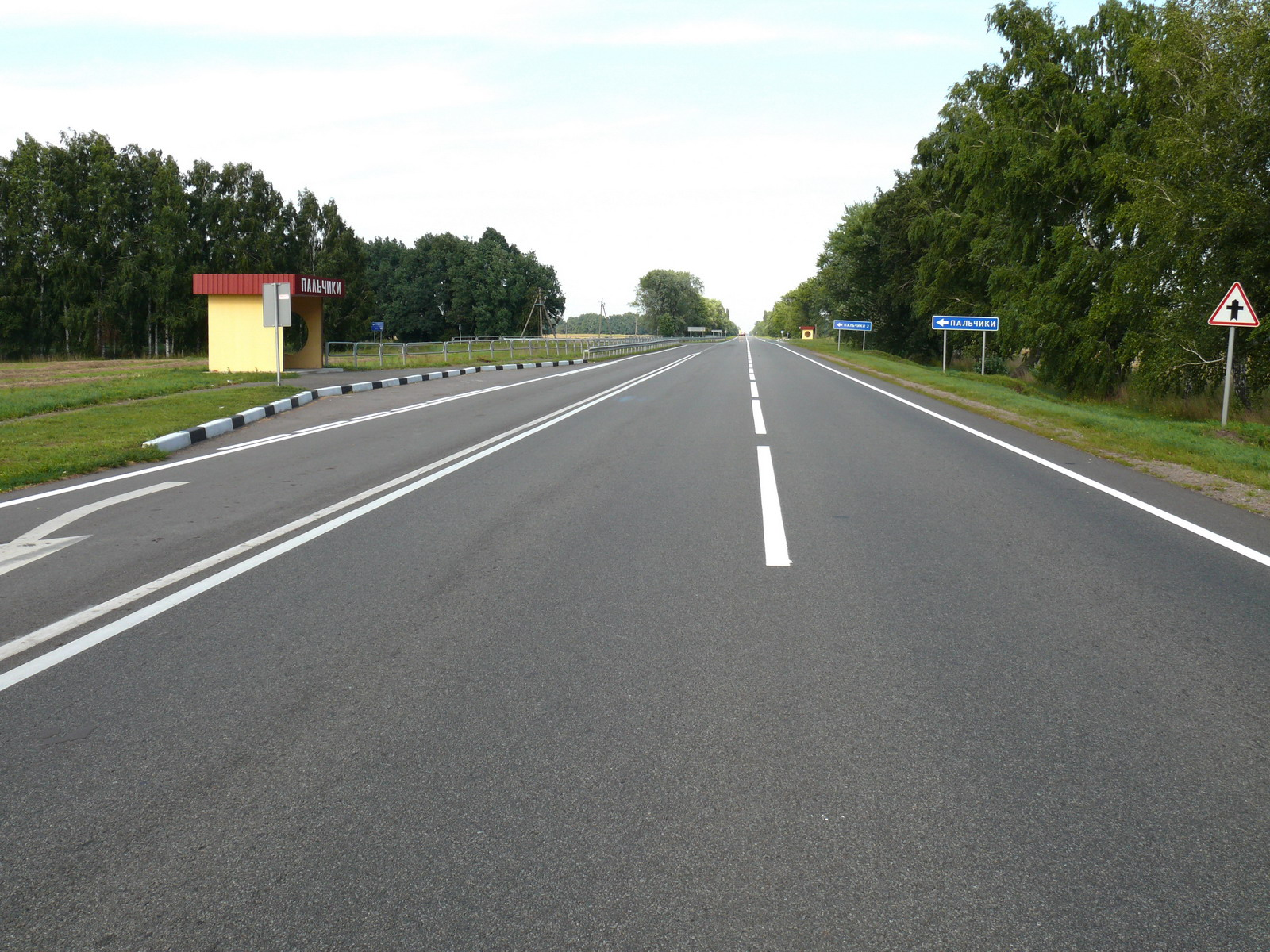
M02 road near Baturyn

Highway M02 is a Ukraine international highway (M-highway) connecting the M01 near Kipti with Bachivsk on the border with Russia, where it continues as the M3 to Moscow. The entire route is part of European route E101 and the section from Hlukhiv to the Russian border is part of European route E391.

The M02 stretches through both the Chernihiv Oblast and the Sumy Oblast and ends at the border checkpoint at Bachivsk which is part of Hlukhiv Raion. The route goes through several historical cities of the Cossack Ukraine of 17th century.

== Route ==
Marker	Main settlements	Notes	Highway Interchanges
0 km	near Kipti		E95/ E101 M 01
	Lykhachiv		T2525
	Zrub		P 67 • T2522
51	Yunist (Note: near Nizhyn)	western side	P 67
93	Borzna	southern side	T2524
	Shapovalivka	southern side	T2523
	Palchyky	southern side	T2531
126	Baturyn		P 61
	Poliske		T2516
168	Krolevets		P 60 • T1907 • T2503
208	Hlukhiv	northern side	P 65
252 km	Bachivsk / Border (Russia)		E101/ E391 (Russia) M 3

== See also ==
- Ukraine Highways
- International E-road network
- Pan-European corridors
