= European route E101 =

Road in trans-European E-road network

E101

Route information
- Length: 854 km (531 mi)

Major junctions
- North end: Moscow, Russia
- South end: Kyiv, Ukraine

Location
- Countries: Russia; Ukraine

Highway system
- International E-road network; A Class; B Class

European route E101 is a road part of the International E-road network. It begins in Moscow, Russia, and ends in Kyiv, Ukraine. It is 850 km (530 mi) long.

== Route ==
Russia

- M 3: Moscow - Kaluga - Bryansk - border with Ukraine

Ukraine

- M 02: border with Russia - Hlukhiv - Kipti
- M 01: Kipti - Kyiv

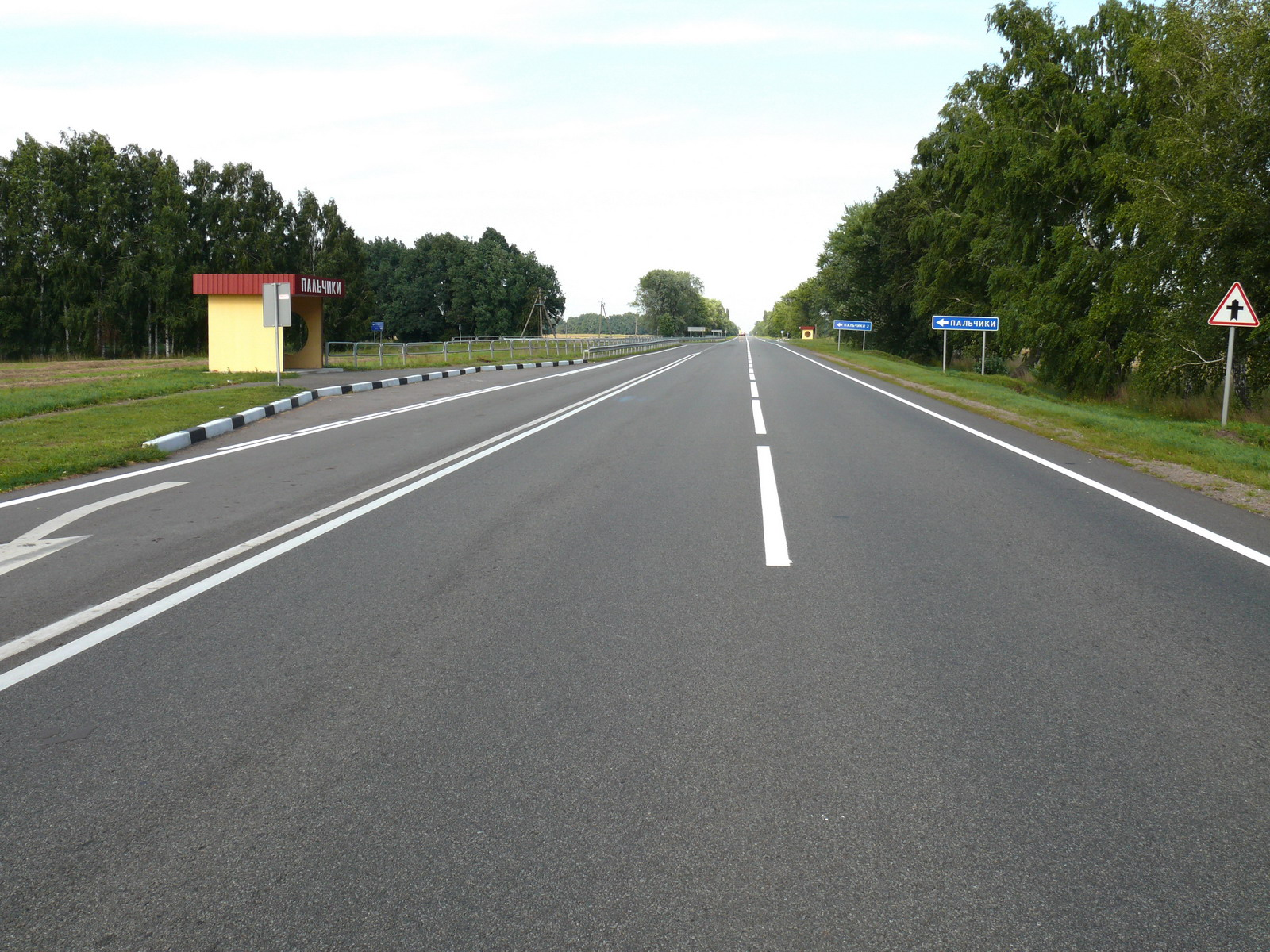
Baturyn
