= Monuments of national significance in Chernihiv Oblast =

Cultural heritage plaque of the Kochubey House in Baturyn

The State Register of Immovable Monuments of Ukraine classifies cultural heritage monuments as either of local or national significance. (Note: 'Monuments of national significance' may also be translated as 'monuments of national importance'; Ukrainian: пам'ятки національного значення) To be classified as nationally significant, a monument must have had a substantial impact on the country's culture, been associated with major historical events or individuals who shaped national culture, represented a masterpiece of creative genius, or embodied a disappeared civilisation or disappeared artistic style. Monuments of national significance are inscribed on the register by the Cabinet of Ministers, and are protected and maintained by the Ministry of Culture. All listed monuments belong to at least one of the following categories: archaeology, history, monumental art, architecture, urban planning, garden and park art, landscape, or science and technology. (Note: The categories are defined as such: Archaeological monuments are underground or underwater remains of human activity that bear testimony to the origin or development of civilisation.; Historic monuments are buildings, structures, burials, and other sites associated with important historical events or the lives and activities of prominent individuals.; Monuments of monumental art are works of fine art.; Architectural monuments are buildings and structures that retain full or partial authenticity and express characteristics of a particular culture, era, style, construction technique, or represent works of renowned architects.; Urban planning monuments are historic neighbourhoods, streets, squares, or ensembles with preserved spatial layouts and architectural integrity.; Monuments of garden and park art combine park construction with natural or anthropogenic landscapes.; Landscape monuments are natural areas possessing historical value.; Monuments of science and technology are industrial, engineering, or scientific sites that reflect the scientific and technological development of an era or discipline.)

The first attempts to establish registers of protected buildings were undertaken in 1917 and 1918 by the Ukrainian People's Republic. These efforts continued in the 1920s in Soviet Ukraine, culminating in the listing of thousands of monuments, but were halted in the 1930s with the dissolution of relevant institutions and the active destruction of cultural—particularly religious—heritage. The listing of cultural heritage monuments in the region was renewed in 1956. A list of architectural monuments was approved in 1963, followed by a separate list of artistic, historic, and archaeological monuments in 1965. Both lists remained in use after Ukraine declared independence in 1991. On 8 June 2000, the State Register of Immovable Monuments was established with the adoption of the law On the Protection of Cultural Heritage. All entries from the Soviet-era list of artistic, historic, and archaeological monuments were transferred to the new register on 14 September 2009. The transfer of monuments from the Soviet architectural register, however, has proceeded more slowly and remains incomplete as of 2026, although the process has accelerated in recent years. At the same time, a number of sites have been deprived of their protected status to comply with decommunisation and derussification laws in effect since 2015 and 2023, respectively.

Chernihiv Oblast is located in northern Ukraine and contains 182 monuments of national significance. (Note: One monument of national significance in the oblast remains on the Soviet-era register: the wooden outbuilding of the manor in Kozelets, which was destroyed in the 1980s. Another monument—St Nicholas Church from Horodyshche—was relocated to the National Museum of Folk Architecture and Folkways of Ukraine in Kyiv in 2016, but is indicated on the register as a monument in Chernihiv Oblast. These sites are not included in this list.) It is divided into five raions (districts) – Chernihiv, Koriukivka, Nizhyn, Novhorod-Siverskyi, and Pryluky – which include 69, 11, 28, 26, and 48 monuments of national significance, respectively. Of the total, 140 are classified as architectural monuments, 45 as historic, 32 as archaeological, and 1 as monumental art, with 36 monuments belonging to multiple categories. The architectural monuments date from the 11th to the 20th centuries. The latest inscriptions date to September 2024. Two monuments—Manor of the Lyzohub family in Sedniv and Gymnasium (Lyceum) in Nizhyn—are listed twice.

== Chernihiv Raion ==
Monuments of national significance in Chernihiv Raion
Name (Note: The names listed are unofficial translations as the register is only available in Ukrainian. The official Ukrainian names are shown below each translation, with links to the corresponding Ukrainian Wikipedia articles if applicable.)	Location	Date constructed (Note: Datings of the monuments as indicated on the register)	Date designated (Note: For monuments previously listed on a Soviet-era register, the date of transfer to the modern register is indicated.)	Coordinates	Type	Protection number (Note: Every monument is assigned a unique protection number, and those of national significance located in Chernihiv Oblast start with the digits 25.)	Photo	Ref.
Trinity Church Троїцька церква	Bihach	1831	10 September 2024	51.62607°N 31.63094°E	Architectural	250097	More images	
Dytynets of the legendary city of Chernihiv Дитинець літописного міста Чернігова	Chernihiv	9th–13th centuries	14 September 2009	51.48727°N 31.30866°E	Archaeological	250001-Н	More images	
Kurgan cemetery "Boldyni Hory" Курганний могильник "Болдині Гори"	Chernihiv	9th–13th centuries	14 September 2009	51.47914°N 31.28493°E	Archaeological	250002-Н	More images	
Manor of the writer and public activist M. M. Kotsiubynsky Садиба письменника і громадського діяча М. М. Коцюбинського	Chernihiv	Late 19th – early 20th centuries	14 September 2009	51.48706°N 31.28748°E	Historic	250003-Н	More images	
Kurgan "Chorna Mohyla" Курган "Чорна Могила"	Chernihiv	9th–13th centuries	14 September 2009	51.48741°N 31.29394°E	Archaeological	250004-Н	More images	
Grave of the poet and fabulist L. I. Hlibov Могила поета і байкаря Л. І. Глібова	Chernihiv	1893	14 September 2009	51.47724°N 31.28054°E	Historic	250005-Н	More images	
Grave of the writer and public activist M. M. Kotsiubynsky Могила письменника і громадського діяча М. М. Коцюбинського	Chernihiv	1913	14 September 2009	51.47822°N 31.28490°E	Historic	250006-Н	More images	
Hillfort "Yalivshchyna" Городище "Ялівщина"	Chernihiv	2nd millennium – 10th century BCE, 9th century BCE – 4th century CE, 9th–13th centuries	14 September 2009	51.52336°N 31.29774°E	Archaeological	250007-Н	More images	
Building complex of the Yeletskyi Monastery Комплекс споруд Єлецького монастиря	Chernihiv	12th–17th centuries	19 October 2012	51.48581°N 31.29516°E	Architectural, historic	250043-Н	More images	
Dormition Cathedral Успенський собор	Chernihiv	12th–17th centuries	19 October 2012	51.48532°N 31.29524°E	Architectural, historic	250043/1-Н	More images	
Bell tower of the Dormition Cathedral Дзвіниця Успенського собору	Chernihiv	17th century	19 October 2012	51.48602°N 31.29577°E	Architectural, historic	250043/2-Н	More images	
Northern cells Північні келії	Chernihiv	16th–17th centuries	19 October 2012	51.48564°N 31.29581°E	Architectural, historic	250043/3-Н	More images	
Eastern cells Східні келії	Chernihiv	16th–17th centuries	19 October 2012	51.48525°N 31.29611°E	Architectural, historic	250043/4-Н	More images	
Southwestern cells Південно-західні келії	Chernihiv	16th–17th centuries	19 October 2012	51.48509°N 31.29447°E	Architectural, historic	250043/5-Н	More images	
Walls and gates Мури та брами	Chernihiv	17th century	19 October 2012	51.48632°N 31.29452°E	Architectural, historic	250043/6-Н	More images	
Theodosius's House (wooden) Будинок Феодосія (дерев'яний)	Chernihiv	1688	10 September 2024	51.48614°N 31.29531°E	Architectural	250043/7-Н	More images	
Building complex of the Trinity and St Elijah Monastery Комплекс споруд Троїцько-Іллінського монастиря	Chernihiv	11th–19th centuries	19 October 2012	51.47750°N 31.27980°E	Architectural, historic	250044-Н	More images	
Trinity Cathedral Троїцький собор	Chernihiv	17th century	19 October 2012	51.47736°N 31.28043°E	Architectural, historic	250044/1-Н	More images	
Bell tower of the Trinity Cathedral Дзвіниця Троїцького собору	Chernihiv	18th century	19 October 2012	51.47774°N 31.27921°E	Architectural, historic	250044/2-Н	More images	
Presentation Church Введенська церква	Chernihiv	17th century	19 October 2012	51.47700°N 31.28079°E	Architectural, historic	250044/3-Н	More images	
Northeastern cells Північно-східні келії	Chernihiv	17th–18th centuries	19 October 2012	51.47777°N 31.28078°E	Architectural, historic	250044/4-Н	More images	
Southern cells Південні келії	Chernihiv	17th–18th centuries	19 October 2012	51.47672°N 31.28009°E	Architectural, historic	250044/5-Н	More images	
Southwestern cells Південно-західні келії	Chernihiv	17th–18th centuries	19 October 2012	51.47667°N 31.27894°E	Architectural, historic	250044/6-Н	More images	
Archiereus's house Будинок архієрея	Chernihiv	18th century	19 October 2012	51.47703°N 31.27942°E	Architectural, historic	250044/7-Н	More images	
St Elijah Gate (printing house) Іллінська брама (друкарня)	Chernihiv	18th century	15 November 2022	51.47773°N 31.28136°E	Architectural	250044/8	More images	
Walls with gates and towers Мури з брамами та баштами Троїцько-Іллінського монастиря	Chernihiv	17th–18th centuries	15 November 2022	51.47735°N 31.27786°E	Architectural	250044/9	More images	
Governor's house (Note: The building now houses the Chernihiv Regional Historical Museum.) Будинок губернатора	Chernihiv	19th century	15 November 2022	51.48914°N 31.30935°E	Architectural	250045	More images	
House of the Regiment Chancellery (House of Y. Lyzohub) Будинок полкової канцелярії (Будинок Я. Лизогуба)	Chernihiv	17th century	15 November 2022	51.48759°N 31.30972°E	Architectural	250046	More images	
St Paraskeva's Church П'ятницька церква	Chernihiv	12th century	15 November 2022	51.49247°N 31.30081°E	Architectural	250047	More images	
St Catherine's Church Катерининська церква	Chernihiv	18th century	15 November 2022	51.48711°N 31.30525°E	Architectural	250048	More images	
Archbishop's house Будинок архієпископа	Chernihiv	18th century	15 November 2022	51.48976°N 31.30731°E	Architectural	250049	More images	
Collegium Колегіум	Chernihiv	17th–18th centuries	15 November 2022	51.48933°N 31.30609°E	Architectural	250050	More images	
Saviour-Transfiguration Cathedral Спасо-Преображенський собор	Chernihiv	11th century	15 November 2022	51.48899°N 31.30763°E	Architectural	250051	More images	
Sts Boris and Gleb Cathedral Борисоглібський собор	Chernihiv	12th century	15 November 2022	51.48927°N 31.30680°E	Architectural	250052	More images	
St Elijah Church of the Trinity and St Elijah Monastery Іллінська церква Троїцько-Іллінського монастиря	Chernihiv	Late 11th – early 12th centuries	15 November 2022	51.47774°N 31.28424°E	Architectural	250053/1	More images	
Bell tower of the St Elijah Church of the Trinity and St Elijah Monastery Дзвіниця Іллінської церкви Троїцько-Іллінського монастиря	Chernihiv	Late 17th – 19th centuries	15 November 2022	51.47789°N 31.28402°E	Architectural	250053/2	More images	
Caves, underground churches, and other underground structures (St Anthony's Caves) Печери, підземні церкви та інші підземні споруди (Антонієві печери)	Chernihiv	11th–18th centuries	15 November 2022	—	Architectural	250053/3	More images	
St George's Church Георгіївська церква	Danivka	1770	10 September 2024	50.87630°N 31.17958°E	Architectural	250103	More images	
Hillfort "Horodyshche" Городище "Городище"	Hnizdyshche	9th century BCE – 4th century CE	14 September 2009	51.86070°N 31.46990°E	Archaeological	250009-Н		
Hillfort "Horodok" Городище "Городок"	Karpivka	9th century BCE – 4th century CE, 5th–9th centuries	14 September 2009	52.06343°N 31.39315°E	Archaeological	250010-Н		
Kurgan cemetery Курганний могильник	Kloniv	10th century	14 September 2009	51.62595°N 30.74764°E	Archaeological	250028-Н		
Cathedral of the Nativity of the Theotokos and bell tower Собор Різдва Богородиці та дзвіниця	Kozelets	1752–1766	10 September 2024	50.91164°N 31.11062°E	Architectural	250098	More images	
Regiment chancellery building Будинок полкової канцелярії	Kozelets	1740–1760	10 September 2024	50.91006°N 31.11081°E	Architectural	250099	More images	
St Nicholas Church Миколаївська церква	Kozelets	1745	10 September 2024	50.90990°N 31.10572°E	Architectural	250100	More images	
Pokorshchyna Manor Садиба Покорщина	Kozelets	18th century	10 September 2024	50.90070°N 31.12475°E	Architectural	250101	More images	
Main building of Pokorshchyna Manor (wooden) Головний будинок садиби Покорщина (дерев'яний)	Kozelets	18th century	10 September 2024	50.90071°N 31.12510°E	Architectural	250101/1	More images	
Stone house of Pokorshchyna Manor Кам'яниця садиби Покорщина	Kozelets	18th century	10 September 2024	50.90076°N 31.12427°E	Architectural	250101/2	More images	
Ascension Church Вознесенська церква	Kozelets	1866–1874	10 September 2024	50.91255°N 31.11469°E	Architectural	250102	More images	
Three Holy Hierarchs Church Трьохсвятительська церква	Lemeshi	1755	10 September 2024	50.99572°N 31.13943°E	Architectural	250105	More images	
Monument complex of the legendary city of Liubech Комплекс пам'яток літописного міста Любеча	Liubech	9th–13th centuries	14 September 2009	51.70970°N 30.65981°E	Archaeological	250029-Н	More images	
Saviour-Transfiguration Church Спасо-Преображенська церква	Liubech	Early 19th century	10 September 2024	51.70474°N 30.65802°E	Architectural	250106	More images	
Stone house Кам'яниця	Liubech	18th century	10 September 2024	51.70558°N 30.65121°E	Architectural	250107	More images	
Hillfort I of the legendary city of Lystven Городище I літописного міста Листвена	Malyi Lystven	9th–13th centuries	14 September 2009	51.71995°N 31.00381°E	Archaeological	250030-Н		
Hillfort II of the legendary city of Lystven Городище II літописного міста Листвена	Malyi Lystven	9th–13th centuries	14 September 2009	51.71983°N 31.00069°E	Archaeological	250031-Н	Earthen ramparts	
St Michael's Church, bell tower, and wall with towers Михайлівська церква, дзвіниця і огорожа з баштами	Mostyshche	18th century	10 September 2024	50.76898°N 31.16632°E	Architectural	250104	More images	
Trinity Church (wooden) and bell tower Троїцька церква (дерев'яна) та дзвіниця	Novyi Bilous	1646	10 September 2024	51.53850°N 31.18896°E	Architectural	250108	More images	
Hillfort-dytynets of the legendary city of Horodets-on-Oster Городище-дитинець літописного міста Городець-на-Острі	Oster	9th–13th centuries	14 September 2009	50.93806°N 30.87427°E	Archaeological	250012-Н	More images	
St George's Chapel Юр'єва божниця	Oster	12th century	10 September 2024	50.93801°N 30.87413°E	Architectural	250109	More images	
Manor of the Lyzohub family Садиба родини Лизогубів	Sedniv	Early 19th century	14 September 2009	51.63795°N 31.57000°E	Historic	250038-Н	More images	
Hillfort of the legendary city of Snovsk Городище літописного міста Сновська	Sedniv	9th–13th centuries, 14th–17th centuries	14 September 2009	51.64500°N 31.56574°E	Archaeological	250039-Н	More images	
Manor of Lyzohub Садиба Лизогуба	Sedniv	Early 19th century	10 September 2024	51.63795°N 31.57000°E	Architectural	250110	More images	
Stone House Кам'яниця	Sedniv	17th century	10 September 2024	51.64167°N 31.56778°E	Architectural	250110/1	More images	
Gazebo Альтанка	Sedniv	19th century	10 September 2024	51.63828°N 31.57124°E	Architectural	250110/2	More images	
Park Парк	Sedniv	18th century	10 September 2024	51.63761°N 31.57167°E	Architectural	250110/3	More images	
Resurrection Church Воскресенська церква	Sedniv	1690	10 September 2024	51.64212°N 31.56664°E	Architectural	250111	More images	
St George's Church Георгіївська церква	Sedniv	17th century	10 September 2024	51.64424°N 31.56593°E	Architectural	250112	More images	
Hillfort "Korovel" Городище "Коровель"	Shestovytsia	5th–9th centuries, 9th–13th centuries	14 September 2009	51.36657°N 31.17943°E	Archaeological	250040-Н	More images	
Settlement Поселення	Syberezh	9th century BCE – 4th century CE, 9th–13th centuries	14 September 2009	51.67223°N 31.11866°E	Archaeological	250032-Н		
St Michael's Church Михайлівська церква	Velykyi Lystven	1742	10 September 2024	51.67223°N 31.11866°E	Architectural	250113		

== Koriukivka Raion ==
Monuments of national significance in Koriukivka Raion
Name	Location	Date constructed	Date designated	Coordinates	Type	Protection number	Photo	Ref.
Hillfort "Drotianka" ("Koliadyn") Городище "Дротянка" ("Колядин")	Buda	9th century BCE – 4th century CE, 9th–13th centuries	14 September 2009	51.72003°N 32.14787°E	Archaeological	250016-Н		
Intercession Church Покровська церква	Diahova	1896	19 October 2012	51.50377°N 32.06279°E	Architectural, historic	250048-Н	More images	
Hillfort "Horodok" Городище "Городок"	Feskivka	2nd millennium – 10th century BCE, 9th century BCE – 4th century CE, 9th–13th centuries	14 September 2009	51.49529°N 32.17856°E	Archaeological	250018-Н	More images	
Hillfort "Viunyshche" Городище "В'юнище"	Khotunychi	9th century BCE – 4th century CE, 5th–9th centuries, 9th–13th centuries	14 September 2009	51.83449°N 31.82138°E	Archaeological	250041-Н		
Settlement "Horodok II" Поселення "Городок II"	Khotunychi	2nd millennium – 10th century BCE	14 September 2009	51.83490°N 31.82693°E	Archaeological	250042-Н		
Hillfort "Tulychiv Horodok" Городище "Туличів Городок"	Kozlianychi	9th century BCE – 4th century CE	14 September 2009	51.71288°N 32.55419°E	Archaeological	250034-Н		
Manor of the director and screenwriter O. P. Dovzhenko Садиба кінорежисера, письменника О. П. Довженка	Sosnytsia	Late 19th – 1st half of 20th centuries	14 September 2009	51.52140°N 32.49933°E	Historic	250033-Н	More images	
Hillfort Городище	Stolne	9th–13th centuries	14 September 2009	51.53008°N 31.92180°E	Archaeological	250017-Н		
St Andrew's Church Андріївська церква	Stolne	1782	10 September 2024	51.50933°N 31.92819°E	Architectural	250055	More images	
Intercession Church Покровська церква	Syniavka	1760	19 October 2012	51.60810°N 32.01318°E	Architectural, historic	250049-Н	More images	
Dormition Church (wooden) Успенська церква (дерев'яна)	Voloskivtsi	18th century	10 September 2024	–	Architectural	250054	More images	

== Nizhyn Raion ==
Monuments of national significance in Nizhyn Raion
Name	Location	Date constructed	Date designated	Coordinates	Type	Protection number	Photo	Ref.
Memorial to the victims of the Baturyn Tragedy of 1708 Пам'ятник жертвам Батуринської трагедії 1708 року	Baturyn	2004	14 September 2009	51.34222°N 32.88768°E	Historic	250008-Н	More images	
Palace of K. H. Rozumovskyi Палац К. Г. Розумовського	Baturyn	1799–1803	10 September 2024	—	Architectural	250056	More images	
Resurrection Church and tomb of K. H. Rozumovskyi Воскресенська церква усипальниця К. Г. Розумовського	Baturyn	1803	10 September 2024	51.34337°N 32.88529°E	Architectural	250057	More images	
General Court House (Kochubey's House) Будинок Генерального суду (Будинок Кочубея)	Baturyn	17th–19th centuries	10 September 2024	51.33648°N 32.87801°E	Architectural	250058	More images	
St Michael's Church Михайлівська церква	Bezuhlivka	1831	10 September 2024	50.94481°N 31.97687°E	Architectural	250075	More images	
Kurgans "Blyzniuky" (2) Кургани "Близнюки" (2)	Bohdanivka	2nd millennium – 10th century BCE, 9th century BCE – 4th century CE	14 September 2009	50.80592°N 31.98253°E	Archaeological	250021-Н		
Settlement "Struha" Поселення "Струга"	Doslidne	2nd millennium – 10th century BCE, 9th century BCE – 4th century CE, 9th–13th centuries	14 September 2009	50.95824°N 31.68207°E	Archaeological	250026-Н	A marsh	
Hillfort "Zamok" ("Huliai-Horodok") of the legendary city of Hlibl Городище "Замок" ("Гуляй-Городок") літописного міста Глебля	Krasnyi Koliadyn	9th–13th centuries, 14th–17th centuries	14 September 2009	50.93842°N 33.03928°E	Archaeological	250036-Н		
Kurgan "Vysoka Mohyla" Курган "Висока Могила"	Kurylivka	2nd millennium – 10th century BCE, 9th century BCE – 4th century CE	14 September 2009	50.97623°N 31.96166°E	Archaeological	250022-Н		
Gymnasium building where L. I. Hlibov, Y. P. Hrebinka, M. V. Hohol, and other prominent figures studied Будинок гімназії, де навчалися Л. І. Глібов, Є. П. Гребінка, М. В. Гоголь та інші видатні діячі	Nizhyn	1st half of the 19th century	14 September 2009	51.05341°N 31.88136°E	Historic	250019-Н	More images	
Monument to M. V. Hohol Пам'ятник письменнику М. В. Гоголю	Nizhyn	1881	14 September 2009	51.04757°N 31.88541°E	Monumental art	250020-Н	More images	
St Nicholas Cathedral Миколаївський собор	Nizhyn	1668	10 September 2024	51.04799°N 31.88706°E	Architectural	250062	More images	
Presentation Cathedral Введенський собор	Nizhyn	1778	10 September 2024	51.04600°N 31.86955°E	Architectural	250063	More images	
Lyceum Ліцей	Nizhyn	1805–1817	10 September 2024	51.05341°N 31.88136°E	Architectural	250064	More images	
All Saints Greek Church Грецька Всіхсвятська церква	Nizhyn	18th century	10 September 2024	—	Architectural	250065	More images	
St Michael's Greek Church Грецька Михайлівська церква	Nizhyn	1714–1731	10 September 2024	—	Architectural	250066	More images	
Trinity Church Троїцька церква	Nizhyn	1733	10 September 2024	51.04947°N 31.88764°E	Architectural	250067	More images	
Intercession Church Покровська церква	Nizhyn	1757	10 September 2024	51.04801°N 31.89380°E	Architectural	250068	More images	
Annunciation Cathedral Благовіщенський собор	Nizhyn	1716	10 September 2024	51.04819°N 31.88472°E	Architectural	250069	More images	
Church of St John the Evangelist (St John's Church) Церква Іоанна Богослова (Іванівська церква)	Nizhyn	18th century	10 September 2024	51.04742°N 31.88197°E	Architectural	250070	More images	
Merchant's house Купецький будинок	Nizhyn	18th century	10 September 2024	51.04934°N 31.88520°E	Architectural	250071	More images	
St Nicholas Church Миколаївська церква	Nizhyn	1743	10 September 2024	—	Architectural	250072	More images	
Transfiguration Church Преображенська церква	Nizhyn	17th century	10 September 2024	51.05338°N 31.89159°E	Architectural	250073	More images	
Residential building Житловий будинок	Nizhyn	17th century	10 September 2024	51.04525°N 31.88819°E	Architectural	250074	More images	
Hillfort Городище	Ploske	9th century BCE – 4th century CE	14 September 2009	51.03339°N 31.66175°E	Archaeological	250027-Н		
Kochubey's house and park Будинок Кочубея з парком	Tynytsia	18th century	10 September 2024	51.13192°N 32.91404°E	Architectural	250060	Dilapidated white one-storey house	
Treasury Скарбниця	Tynytsia	18th century	10 September 2024	51.13168°N 32.91366°E	Architectural	250061	More images	
Bell tower of Baturyn St Nicholas Krupytskyi Monastery Дзвіниця Батуринського Миколо-Крупицького монастиря	Verbivka	1823–1825	10 September 2024	51.40018°N 32.79783°E	Architectural	250059	More images	

== Novhorod-Siverskyi Raion ==
Monuments of national significance in Novhorod-Siverskyi Raion
Name	Location	Date constructed	Date designated	Coordinates	Type	Protection number	Photo	Ref.
Hillfort "Horodyshche" Городище "Городище"	Horodyshche	9th century BCE – 4th century CE	14 September 2009	51.61796°N 32.95420°E	Archaeological	250014-Н		
House where the revolutionary narodnik and inventor M. I. Kybalchych was born Будинок, у якому народився революціонер-народник, винахідник М. І. Кибальчич	Korop	Mid-19th century	14 September 2009	51.57129°N 32.95363°E	Historic	250013-Н	More images	
Ascension Church Вознесенська церква	Korop	1764	10 September 2024	51.56425°N 32.95096°E	Architectural	250076	More images	
St Elijah Church Іллінська церква	Korop	18th century	10 September 2024	—	Architectural	250077	More images	
St Nicholas Church Микільська церква	Novhorod-Siverskyi	1720	19 October 2012	—	Architectural, historic	250050-Н	More images	
Saviour-Transfiguration Monastery Спасо-Преображенський монастир	Novhorod-Siverskyi	16th–18th centuries (Note: Although the Saviour-Transfiguration Monastery complex is dated to the 16th–17th centuries on the register, its individual components date as far as the 18th century. This dating has been adjusted accordingly.)	10 September 2024	52.00904°N 33.28295°E	Architectural	250082	More images	
Saviour-Transfiguration Cathedral Спасо-Преображенський собор	Novhorod-Siverskyi	1796	10 September 2024	52.00937°N 33.28342°E	Architectural	250082/1	More images	
Bell tower Дзвіниця	Novhorod-Siverskyi	16th–17th centuries	10 September 2024	52.00873°N 33.28242°E	Architectural	250082/2	More images	
Chamber building and Sts Peter and Paul Church Палатний корпус з Петропавлівською церквою	Novhorod-Siverskyi	16th–17th centuries	10 September 2024	52.00883°N 33.28334°E	Architectural	250082/3	More images	
Hegumen's house and St Elijah Church Покої настоятеля з Іллінською церквою	Novhorod-Siverskyi	16th–17th centuries	10 September 2024	52.00930°N 33.28253°E	Architectural	250082/4	More images	
Cells Келії	Novhorod-Siverskyi	17th century	10 September 2024	52.00996°N 33.28289°E	Architectural	250082/5	More images	
Bursa Бурса	Novhorod-Siverskyi	17th century	10 September 2024	52.00974°N 33.28390°E	Architectural	250082/6	More images	
Walls and towers Мури та башти	Novhorod-Siverskyi	17th century	10 September 2024	52.00935°N 33.28555°E	Architectural	250082/7	More images	
Dormition Cathedral Успенський собор	Novhorod-Siverskyi	1671	10 September 2024	52.01192°N 33.26576°E	Architectural	250083	More images	
Triumphal Gate (Triumphal Arch) Тріумфальна брама (Тріумфальна арка)	Novhorod-Siverskyi	1786	10 September 2024	52.00584°N 33.27420°E	Architectural	250084	More images	
Shopping arcade (eastern building) Торгові ряди (східний корпус)	Novhorod-Siverskyi	Early 19th century	10 September 2024	52.00944°N 33.26563°E	Architectural	250085/1	More images	
Shopping arcade (western building) Торгові ряди (західний корпус)	Novhorod-Siverskyi	Early 19th century	10 September 2024	52.00952°N 33.26410°E	Architectural	250085/2	More images	
Commercial warehouse Торгові склади	Novhorod-Siverskyi	Early 19th century	10 September 2024	52.00907°N 33.26464°E	Architectural	250086	More images	
Church of the Dormition of the Theotokos Церква Різдва Богородиці	Obolonnia	1801	10 September 2024	51.61769°N 32.94061°E	Architectural	250080	More images	
Group of dwellings "Pushkari" (20) Група стоянок "Пушкарі" (20)	Pushkari	1.5 million – 10,000 BCE	14 September 2009	52.18936°N 33.29886°E	Archaeological	250023-Н		
Transfiguration Church Преображенська церква	Raihorodok	1820	10 September 2024	51.63099°N 33.09264°E	Architectural	250081	More images	
Hillfort "Radychivske-1" ("Puzyr-Khutir", "Fostenske") Городище "Радичівське-1" ("Пузир-Хутір", "Фостенське")	Radychiv	9th century BCE – 4th century CE	14 September 2009	51.77145°N 33.07013°E	Archaeological	250015-Н	More images	
Group of dwellings "Smiachka" (20) Група стоянок "Смячка" (20)	Smiach	9th–7th millennia BCE	14 September 2009	52.10542°N 33.25967°E	Archaeological	250024-Н		
Palace Палац	Vyshenky	18th century	10 September 2024	51.64148°N 33.06153°E	Architectural	250078	More images	
Dormition Church Успенська церква	Vyshenky	18th century	10 September 2024	51.64483°N 33.07055°E	Architectural	250079	More images	
Hillforts "Zakhidne" and "Skhidne" Городища "Західне" і "Східне"	Yukhnove	9th century BCE – 4th century CE	14 September 2009	51.94313°N 33.26191°E	Archaeological	250025-Н		

== Pryluky Raion ==
Monuments of national significance in Pryluky Raion
Name	Location	Date constructed	Date designated	Coordinates	Type	Protection number	Photo	Ref.
Manor house Садибний будинок	Dihtiari	19th century	10 September 2024	—	Architectural	250093	More images	
Hillfort Городище	Horodnia	9th century BCE – 4th century CE	14 September 2009	50.76906°N 32.48989°E	Archaeological	250011-Н		
Hustynia Monastery Густинський монастир	Hustynia	1614–1844 (Note: Although the Hustynia Monastery complex is dated to 1672–1674 on the register, its individual components date from 1614 to 1844. This dating has been adjusted accordingly.)	10 September 2024	50.63644°N 32.47424°E	Architectural	250095	More images	
Trinity Cathedral Троїцький собор	Hustynia	1672–1674	10 September 2024	50.63647°N 32.47481°E	Architectural	250095/1	More images	
Sts Peter and Paul Gate Church Петропавлівська надбрамна церква	Hustynia	1693–1708	10 September 2024	50.63621°N 32.47550°E	Architectural	250095/2	More images	
Dormition Church and refectory (Resurrection Refectory Church) Успенська церква з трапезною (Воскресенська трапезна церква)	Hustynia	1636–1844	10 September 2024	50.63588°N 32.47480°E	Architectural	250095/3	More images	
St Nicholas Gate Church-Bell Tower Надбрамна Миколаївська церква-дзвіниця	Hustynia	1693–1708	10 September 2024	50.63633°N 32.47274°E	Architectural	250095/4	More images	
Hegumen's house Корпус настоятеля	Hustynia	1719	10 September 2024	50.63697°N 32.47405°E	Architectural	250095/5	More images	
Hotel Готель	Hustynia	1843	10 September 2024	50.63612°N 32.47193°E	Architectural	250095/6	More images	
Walls and gates Мури та брами	Hustynia	1614–1636	10 September 2024	50.63710°N 32.47335°E	Architectural	250095/7	More images	
Palace and Park Complex "Kachanivka" Палацово-парковий комплекс "Качанівка"	Kachanivka	1824–1902	19 October 2012	50.83682°N 32.65576°E	Architectural, historic	250045-Н	More images	
Palace with two outbuildings (northern and southern) Палац з двома флігелями (північним та південним)	Kachanivka	1824–1853	19 October 2012	50.83667°N 32.65516°E	Architectural, historic	250045-Н/1	More images	
Water tower Водогінна вежа	Kachanivka	1866–1898	19 October 2012	50.83646°N 32.65560°E	Architectural, historic	250045-Н/2	More images	
Northern service building Північні служби	Kachanivka	1830–1840	19 October 2012	50.83708°N 32.65607°E	Architectural, historic	250045-Н/3	More images	
Southern service building Південні служби	Kachanivka	1830–1840	19 October 2012	50.83654°N 32.65609°E	Architectural, historic	250045-Н/4	More images	
Gazebo of M. I. Glinka Альтанка М. І. Глінки	Kachanivka	Late 18th century, 1830	19 October 2012	50.83832°N 32.65331°E	Architectural, historic	250045-Н/5	More images	
St George's Church Георгіївська церква	Kachanivka	1817–1827	19 October 2012	50.83743°N 32.66355°E	Architectural, historic	250045-Н/6	More images	
Service building Будівля господарська	Kachanivka	1770s–1780s	19 October 2012	50.83762°N 32.65958°E	Architectural, historic	250045-Н/7	More images	
Park Парк	Kachanivka	Mid-18th – late 19th centuries	19 October 2012	50.83883°N 32.65636°E	Architectural, historic	250045-Н/8	More images	
Electrician's and mechanic's house Будинок електротехніка та механіка	Kachanivka	2nd half of the 19th century, 1911	19 October 2012	50.83620°N 32.65675°E	Architectural, historic	250045-Н/9	More images	
Power and water station building Будинок електричної та водогінної станції	Kachanivka	1898–1902	19 October 2012	50.83594°N 32.65651°E	Architectural, historic	250045-Н/10	More images	
Cowhouse Корівник	Kachanivka	Mid-19th century	19 October 2012	—	Architectural, historic	250045-Н/11	More images	
Baptistry of St George's Church Хрещальня Георгіївської церкви	Kachanivka	1820s	19 October 2012	50.83720°N 32.66317°E	Architectural, historic	250045-Н/12	More images	
Sacristy of St George's Church Ризниця Георгіївської церкви	Kachanivka	1820s	19 October 2012	50.83758°N 32.66309°E	Architectural, historic	250045-Н/13	More images	
Sculptural composition "Heraldic Lions" Скульптурна композиція "Геральдичні Леви"	Kachanivka	2nd half of the 19th century	19 October 2012	50.83690°N 32.65676°E	Architectural, historic	250045-Н/14	More images	
Brick fence Цегляна огорожа	Kachanivka	2nd half of the 19th century	19 October 2012	50.83687°N 32.65666°E	Architectural, historic	250045-Н/15	Whitewashed brick wall	
Park bridge in "Empty Well" tract Парковий місток в балці "Пуста криниця"	Kachanivka	1860–1870	19 October 2012	50.83333°N 32.65703°E	Architectural, historic	250045-Н/16	More images	
Arch bridge near "Romantic Ruins" Арковий місток неподалік "Романтичних руїн"	Kachanivka	1860–1870	19 October 2012	50.83499°N 32.65117°E	Architectural, historic	250045-Н/17	More images	
Kurgan cemetery "Vyhon" Курганний могильник "Вигон"	Lypove	9th–13th centuries	14 September 2009	50.88854°N 33.14415°E	Archaeological	250037-Н		
St Michael's Church Михайлівська церква	Polonky	1660	10 September 2024	—	Architectural	250087	More images	
Saviour-Transfiguration Cathedral Спасо-Преображенський собор	Pryluky	1705–1720	10 September 2024	50.59799°N 32.38876°E	Architectural	250089	More images	
Regimental treasury Полкова скарбниця	Pryluky	1708	10 September 2024	50.59860°N 32.38882°E	Architectural	250090	More images	
St Nicholas Church Миколаївська церква	Pryluky	1720	10 September 2024	50.59784°N 32.38778°E	Architectural	250091	More images	
Church of the Nativity of the Theotokos Церква Різдва Богородиці	Pryluky	18th century	10 September 2024	50.59654°N 32.38731°E	Architectural	250092	More images	
Grave of the kobzar Ostap Veresai Могила кобзаря Остапа Вересая	Sokyryntsi	1890	14 September 2009	50.69946°N 32.77855°E	Historic	250035-Н	More images	
Manor Садиба	Sokyryntsi	Early 19th century	10 September 2024	50.69580°N 32.76720°E	Architectural	250094	More images	
Palace Палац	Sokyryntsi	Early 19th century	10 September 2024	50.69539°N 32.76801°E	Architectural	250094/1	More images	
Walls and entrance gate Мури та в'їзна брама	Sokyryntsi	Early 19th century	10 September 2024	—	Architectural	250094/2	More images	
Stable Стайня	Sokyryntsi	Early 19th century	10 September 2024	—	Architectural	250094/3	More images	
Gazebo Альтанка	Sokyryntsi	Early 19th century	10 September 2024	50.69255°N 32.77261°E	Architectural	250094/4	More images	
Service building (southern) Службовий флігель (південний)	Sokyryntsi	Early 19th century	10 September 2024	—	Architectural	250094/5	More images	
Service building (northern) Службовий флігель (північний)	Sokyryntsi	Early 19th century	10 September 2024	—	Architectural	250094/6	More images	
Orangery Оранжерея	Sokyryntsi	Early 19th century	10 September 2024	—	Architectural	250094/7		
Bridge Місток	Sokyryntsi	Early 19th century	10 September 2024	—	Architectural	250094/8	More images	
Park Парк	Sokyryntsi	Early 19th century	10 September 2024	50.69311°N 32.77034°E	Architectural	250094/9	More images	
Church of the Dormition of the Theotokos Церква Успіння Богородиці	Svarychivka	1709	19 October 2012	50.95908°N 32.33509°E	Architectural	250046-Н		
Park Парк	Trostianets	1834	10 September 2024	50.79022°N 32.81650°E	Architectural	250088	More images	
Transfiguration Church and bell tower Преображенська церква та дзвіниця	Yablunivka	1814	10 September 2024	—	Architectural	250096	More images	

== See also ==
- List of historic reserves in Ukraine
- Ukrainian architecture
