= Hordiyenko =

Hordiyenko/Hordiienko/Hordienko (Ukrainian: Гордієнко) or Gordiyenko/Gordiienko/Gordienko (Russian: Гордиенко), transliterated in Romanian as Gordienco, is a Ukrainian patronymic surname derived from the first name Hordiy/Gordey (Ukrainian: Гордій; Russian: Гордей), from Saint Gordianus. The name also appears in the variant Hordeyenko (Ukrainian: Гордеєнко) or Gordeyenko/Gordeenko (Russian: Гордеенко).

== People ==
=== Hordiienko ===
- Dmytro Hordiienko (born 1977), Ukrainian historian and scientist
- Kost Hordiienko (died 1733), Zaporozhian Cossack Kosh otaman

=== Hordijenko ===
- Nadija Hordijenko Andrianova (1921–1998), Ukrainian writer and translator

=== Hordiyenko ===
- Artem Hordiyenko (born 1991), Ukrainian footballer
- Dmytro Hordiyenko (born 1983), Ukrainian footballer
- Yakiv Hordiyenko (1925–1942), Soviet partisan

=== Gordienko ===
- George Gordienko (1928–2002), Canadian wrestler and artist
- Natalia Gordienko (born 1987), Moldovan singer and dancer

=== Gordiienko ===
- Oleksandr Gordiienko (born 1991), Ukrainian judoka
- Serhii Gordiienko (born 1971), Ukrainian boxing trainer

=== Gordiyenko ===
- Dmitriy Gordiyenko (born 1986), Kazakhstani swimmer
- Ruslan Gordiyenko (born 1995), Russian footballer

== See also ==
- Gordeev
- Gordievsky
