= Chaikyne =

Chaikyne (Ukrainian: Чайкине) may refer to the following places in Ukraine:

- Chaikyne, Chernihiv Oblast, village in Novhorod-Siverskyi Raion
- Chaikyne, Dzhankoi Raion, Crimea, village in Dzhankoi Raion
- Chaikyne, Simferopol Raion, Crimea, village in Simferopol Raion
- Chaikyne, Kherson Oblast, village in Kherson Raion
