= Radychiv =

Radychiv Радичів
- Village
- Radychiv
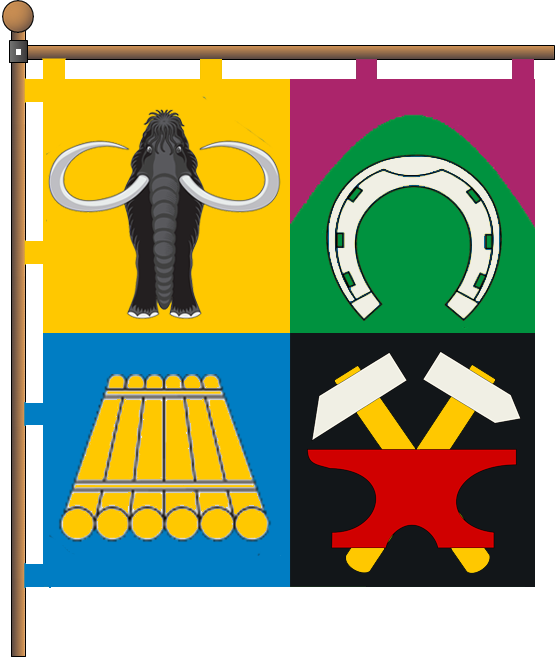
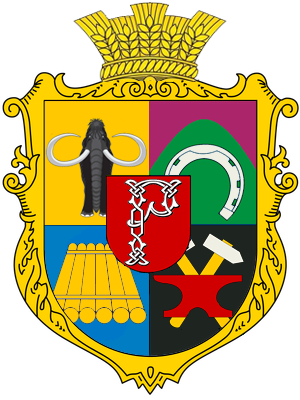
- Flag Coat of arms
- Interactive map of Radychiv
- Location within Chernihiv Oblast Location within Ukraine
- Coordinates: 51°44′31″N 33°03′58″E
- Country: Ukraine
- Oblast: (Chernihiv Oblast) Chernihiv
- Raion: Novhorod-Siverskyi Raion

Government
  - Mayor: Viktor Ivanovych Ivashchenko

Area
  - Total: 4.11 km^{2} (1.59 sq mi)
- Elevation: 143 m (469 ft)

Population (2001)
  - Total: 804
  - Density: 196/km^{2} (507/sq mi)
- Postal code: 16215

Radychiv (Ukrainian: Радичів; German: Raditschew; English, connected with the Hutterites: Radichev) is a small village in Novhorod-Siverskyi Raion, Chernihiv Oblast, Ukraine. The population is about 800 people. The village is located on the right bank of the Desna River. It belongs to Ponornytsia settlement hromada, one of the hromadas of Ukraine.

== History ==
To the north of the village was the ancient Russian city of Radichiv. Near the village were found two settlements of the Yukhnov culture, a settlement of the 1st century AD and a Severyansk settlement. Also near the village are ancient settlements and burial mounds of the Kievan Rus period.

The village played an important role in the history of the Hutterites, because all Hutterite, leaving Vishenka, lived there from 1802 to 1842.

Until 18 July 2020, Radychiv belonged to Korop Raion. The raion was abolished in July 2020 as part of the administrative reform of Ukraine, which reduced the number of raions of Chernihiv Oblast to five. The area of Korop Raion was merged into Novhorod-Siverskyi Raion.

== Geography ==
The area of the Radychiv is 4,109 km^{2}. The Radychiv is located in the north of Ukraine, in the north-eastern part of Chernihiv Oblast, in the Novgorod-Siverskyi Raion. Radychiv is located on the slopes of the Dnieper Lowland. The Desna River, the left tributary of the Dnieper, flows through the community.

The climate Radychiv is moderately continental. Winter is cool, summer is not hot. The average temperature in July is +19 °C, in January -7.5 °C. The maximum precipitation falls in the summer in the form of rain. The average annual amount is from 650 to 700 mm, changing from west to east.

The Radychiv located in the natural zone of mixed forests, in Polissya. Among the trees in the forests, oaks, lindens, and maples dominate. Typical large mammals are elk, roe deer, wild boar, squirrels, beavers, hares and wolves. The most common soils in the area are chornozem and podzol soils. The Mezyn National Park is located near the village.

== Demographics ==
As of the 2001 Ukrainian census, the village had a population of 805 inhabitants. The native language composition was as follows:

Native languages in Radychiv
	percent
Ukrainian	99.5%
Russian	0.5%
others	0.0%
