= Kostobobriv =

Kostobobriv Костобобрів Костобобров
- Village
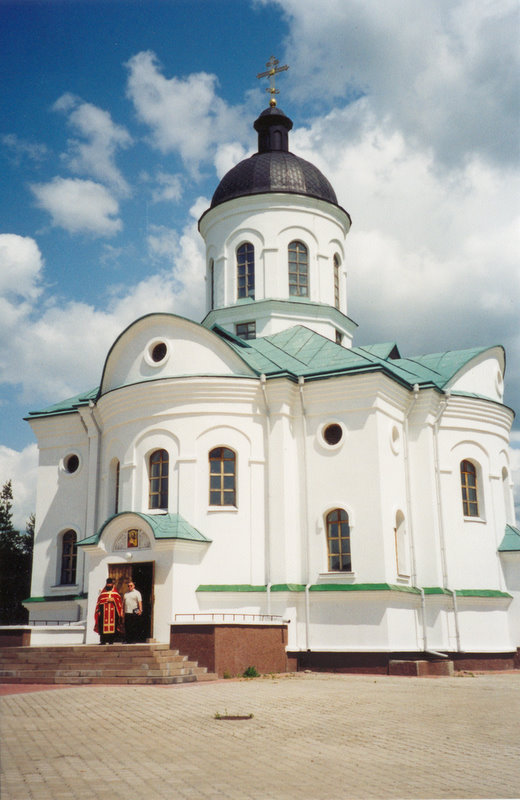
- The Saint Daniel's Church

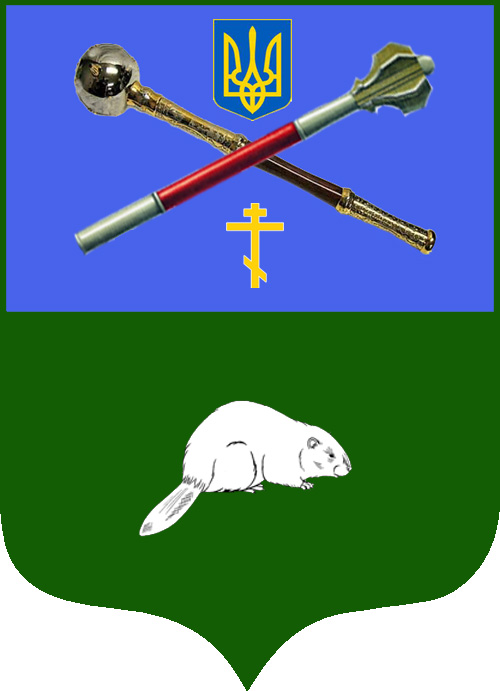
- Coat of arms
- Interactive map of Kostobobriv
- Location of Kostobobriv in Ukraine Kostobobriv (Ukraine)
- Coordinates: 52°14′23″N 32°56′14″E
- Country: Ukraine
- Oblast: Chernihiv Oblast
- Raion: Novhorod-Siverskyi Raion
- Founded: 1200

Government
  - Mayor: Lubov Ruban

Area
  - Total: 263 km^{2} (102 sq mi)
- Elevation: 176 m (577 ft)
- Postal code: 15443
- Website: s. Kostobobriv Chernihivska oblast, Semenivka raion Verkhovna Rada website

Kostobobriv (Ukrainian: Костобобрів; Russian: Костобобров) is a village in Novhorod-Siverskyi Raion (district) of Chernihiv Oblast (province) in northern Ukraine. It belongs to Semenivka urban hromada, one of the hromadas of Ukraine.

Until 18 July 2020, Kostobobriv belonged to Semenivka Raion. The raion was abolished in July 2020 as part of the administrative reform of Ukraine, which reduced the number of raions of Chernihiv Oblast to five. The area of Semenivka Raion was merged into Novhorod-Siverskyi Raion.

== Geography ==
The Kostobobriv is located in the north of Ukraine, in the north part of Chernihiv Oblast, in the Novgorod-Siverskyi Raion. The village is located near the border of Ukraine with Russia. Kostobobriv is located on the Dnieper Lowland, on the Desna basin, the left tributary of the Dnieper.

The climate Kostobobriv is moderately continental. Winter is cool, summer is not hot. The average temperature in July is +19 °C, in January -7.5 °C. The maximum precipitation falls in the summer in the form of rain. The average annual amount is from 650 to 700 mm, changing from west to east.

The Kostobobriv located in the natural zone of mixed forests, in Polissya. Among the trees in the forests, pines, oaks dominate. The most common soils in the area are podzol soils.

Regional roads pass through the village. The nearest railway station is located in the village of Kuty, southwest of the Kostobobriv.

== History ==
The village was founded by Ivan Bystrytsky, the village headman of Sheptaki. He was also a relative of Hetman I. Mazepa. The Intercession Church of the village of Kostobobriv was built at the beginning of the 18th century. In the second half of the 18th century, the village belonged to Count K.G. Rozumovsky.

== Notable people ==
- Isaak Mazepa (1882-1951) - Ukrainian politician, Prime Minister of the Ukrainian People's Republic
- Stepan Mazepa (1927-2006) - Ukrainian Soviet diplomat, father of Anna Politkovskaya.

== See also ==
- Russia–Ukraine border
