= Mars, Ukraine =

Village in Chernihiv Oblast, Ukraine

Mars Марс
- Village
- Interactive map of Mars
- Location of Mars in Chernihiv Oblast Location of Mars in Ukraine
- Coordinates: 52°09′31″N 32°44′20″E
- Country: Ukraine
- Oblast: Chernihiv Oblast
- Raion: Novhorod-Siverskyi Raion
- Founded: before 1925

Area
  - Total: 0.16 km^{2} (0.062 sq mi)

Population (2019)
  - Total: 5
  - Density: 31/km^{2} (81/sq mi)
- Time zone: UTC+2 (EET)
  - Summer (DST): UTC+3 (EEST)
- Postal code: 15432
- Area code: +380 4659
- KOATUU: 7424782005

Mars is a village in Ukraine, in Novhorod-Siverskyi Raion, Chernihiv Oblast. It belongs to Semenivka urban hromada, one of the hromadas of Ukraine. The population is 5 persons; in the early 2000s 30 persons lived in the village.

Until 18 July 2020, Mars belonged to Semenivka Raion. The raion was abolished in July 2020 as part of the administrative reform of Ukraine, which reduced the number of raions of Chernihiv Oblast to five. The area of Semenivka Raion was merged into Novhorod-Siverskyi Raion.

== Name ==
In 1924, when the planet Mars was in opposition to Earth, the Soviet government decided to give the name "Mars" to this village.

== Population ==
In the USSR it had a population of 265. By 1995 the total population had decreased and was only 46 people. In the early 2000s this number reduced again to 30, in 2018 to 6, and in 2019 to 5, the members of two families.

== Tesla photo ==
On 1 February 2019, a journalist from Ukrainian Pravda with support from the Ukrainian company «Electrocars» visited the village of Mars with a Tesla Model S. They took a picture of the Model S showing the village's name Mars and tagged with the name of Elon Musk. They joked that this was the first to reach Mars (Elon Musk launched his Tesla Roadster to Mars, but car didn't reach the planet). Musk answered: "Whoa cool."
