= Vitaly Primakov =

Soviet general (1897–1937)

Vitaly Markovich Primakov
- Віталій Маркович Примаков
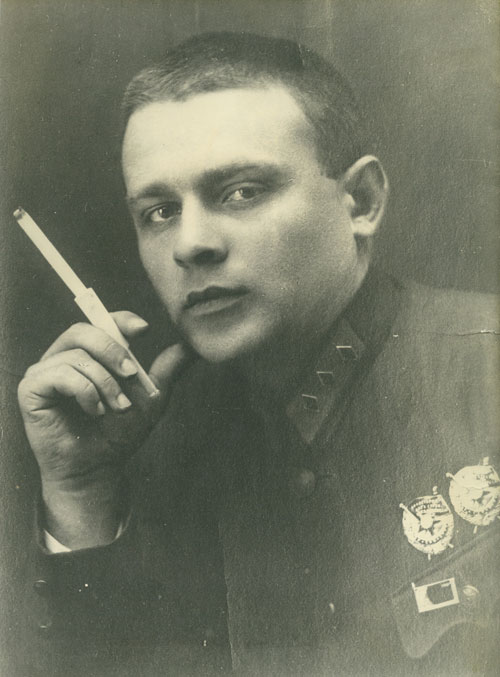
- Primakov in 1925
- Born: 3 December 1897; Semenivka, Novozybkovsky Uyezd, Chernigov Governorate, Russian Empire
- Died: 12 June 1937 (aged 39); Moscow, Soviet Union
- Military career
- Allegiance: Russian SFSR (1918–1922); Soviet Union (1922–1937)
- Service years: 1918–1937
- Rank: Komkor
- Commands: Leningrad Military District
- Conflicts: October Revolution; Russian Civil War; Ukrainian–Soviet War; Basmachi Revolt; Afghan Civil War (1928-1929); Red Army Intervention in Afghanistan
- Awards: Order of the Red Banner (three times)

Vitaliy Markovich Primakov (Russian: Вита́лий Ма́ркович Примако́в, romanized: Vitaliy Markovich Primakov; Ukrainian: Віталій Маркович Примаков, romanized: Vitalii Markovych Prymakov) (3 December 1897 – 12 June 1937) was a Soviet revolutionary, military leader of the Red Army, and commander of the Red Cossacks. He was a close friend of the Kotsiubynsky family and a son-in-law of Mykhailo Kotsiubynsky.

== Early life ==
Vitaly Primakov was born in 1897 in Semenivka, Novozybkovsky Uyezd, Chernigov Governorate as part of a family with a Russian background. In 1914 he joined the Bolshevik faction of the Russian Social Democratic Labour Party and was exiled to Siberia for political reasons in 1915.

== Revolution ==
Primakov was released from exile during the February Revolution in 1917. He became a member of Kiev's Bolshevik committee. In August 1917, he was conscripted into the Russian Army. While being a delegate of Second Congress of Soviets in Petrograd he was assigned commander of one of the squadrons participating in the assault on the Winter Palace. Then he led Red Army squadrons during fights with the White Army troops of Lieutenant General Pyotr Krasnov near Gatchina.

== Civil War ==
In February 1918, using Cossack troops that crossed over to the communists, he formed the Red Cossacks military unit. In August 1919, Primakov became commander of the brigade. In October 1919, he was appointed commander of the Eighth Cavalry Division. In October 1920, Primakov became the commander of the First Corps of Red Cossacks.

For a successful breach of the White Army defense line near Fatezh in November 1919, he was awarded his first Order of the Red Banner. His second Order of the Red Banner was awarded for combat near Proskurov. Primakov then received his third Order of the Red Banner for fighting the Basmachi movement in Central Asia.

== Service after Civil War ==
In 1923 Primakov graduated in Higher Academic Military Courses at RKKA. In 1924–25, he was the head of the Highest Cavalry school in Leningrad.

In 1925, he was sent to China to be military advisor of the Chinese First National Army. In 1927, he was appointed as the military attaché in Afghanistan. In 1929 – under the disguise of Turkish officer Ragib-bey – he led the Red Army intervention in Afghanistan. This was a military operation by Soviet troops to reinstate Amanullah Khan as ruler of Afghanistan. In 1930, Primakov was sent to Japan as military attaché there.

In 1931–33, Primakov was commander of the Thirteenth Infantry Corps. In February 1933 he became deputy commander of the North Caucasus Military District. In December 1934, he was appointed inspector of higher education institutions of Red Army. In January 1935, he became deputy commander of the Leningrad Military District.

== Arrest and Trial ==
Primakov was arrested on 14 August 1936 as part of Stalin's Great Purge. He was subjected to torture and pleaded guilty of being part of Trotskyist Anti-Soviet Military Organization and testified against many fellow Soviet military commanders. He was found guilty and sentenced to death on 11 June 1937. Primakov was rehabilitated posthumously in 1957.

== Personal life ==
Primakov was married three times. He was once married to Oksana Kotsyubynska, the daughter of Mykhailo Kotsyubynsky. In 1930, he married Lilya Brik, the longtime lover of Vladimir Mayakovsky.
