= Vishenki =

Vishenki (Ukrainian: Вишенки, romanized: Vyshenky) may refer to:

- Vishenki, Chernihiv Oblast, a village in Ukraine

Vishenki (Russian: Вишенки) is also the name of several settlements in Russia:

- Vishenki, Starodubsky District, Bryansk Oblast, a village in Zapolskokhaleyevichsky Selsoviet of Starodubsky District of Bryansk Oblast
- Vishenki, Zlynkovsky District, Bryansk Oblast, a settlement in Karpilovsky Selsoviet of Zlynkovsky District of Bryansk Oblast
- Vishenki, Kaluga Oblast, a village in Babyninsky District of Kaluga Oblast
- Vishenki, Lipetsk Oblast, a village in Troitsky Selsoviet of Lev-Tolstovsky District of Lipetsk Oblast
- Vishenki, Mozhaysky District, Moscow Oblast, a village in Zamoshinskoye Rural Settlement of Mozhaysky District of Moscow Oblast
- Vishenki, Ruzsky District, Moscow Oblast, a village in Kolyubakinskoye Rural Settlement of Ruzsky District of Moscow Oblast
- Vishenki, Shakhovskoy District, Moscow Oblast, a village in Stepankovskoye Rural Settlement of Shakhovskoy District of Moscow Oblast
- Vishenki, Volokolamsky District, Moscow Oblast, a village in Spasskoye Rural Settlement of Volokolamsky District of Moscow Oblast
- Vishenki, Buturlinsky District, Nizhny Novgorod Oblast, a settlement in Bolshebakaldsky Selsoviet of Buturlinsky District of Nizhny Novgorod Oblast
- Vishenki, Sechenovsky District, Nizhny Novgorod Oblast, a village in Krasnovsky Selsoviet of Sechenovsky District of Nizhny Novgorod Oblast
- Vishenki, Vachsky District, Nizhny Novgorod Oblast, a village in Novoselsky Selsoviet of Vachsky District of Nizhny Novgorod Oblast
- Vishenki, Smolensk Oblast, a village in Prechistenskoye Rural Settlement of Dukhovshchinsky District of Smolensk Oblast
- Vishenki, Tula Oblast, a village in Malakhovsky Rural Okrug of Zaoksky District of Tula Oblast
- Vishenki, Kalininsky District, Tver Oblast, a village in Burashevskoye Rural Settlement of Kalininsky District of Tver Oblast
- Vishenki, Torzhoksky District, Tver Oblast, a village in Strashevichskoye Rural Settlement of Torzhoksky District of Tver Oblast
- Vishenki, Vladimir Oblast, a selo in Suzdalsky District of Vladimir Oblast
