= Dmytro Hordiienko =

Ukrainian historian, source specialist, scientist (born 1977)

- Дмитро Гордієнко
- Born: Dmytro Serhiiovych Hordiienko; 8 March 1977 (age 49); Ponornytsia, Chernihiv Oblast, Ukrainian SSR, Soviet Union (now Ukraine)
- Education: National University of Kyiv-Mohyla Academy, University of Lviv

Dmytro Serhiiovych Hordiienko (Ukrainian: Дмитро Сергійович Гордієнко; born 8 March 1977) is a Ukrainian historian, source specialist, and scientist, 2013 Candidate of Historical Sciences. He introduced the historical term "Medieval Ukraine".

== Biography ==
Dmytro Hordiienko was born on 8 March 1977 in the town of Ponornytsia, now the Ponornytsia settlement hromada of the Novhorod-Siverskyi Raion, Chernihiv Oblast, Ukraine.

Hordiienko studied at the Faculty of Humanities of the National University of Kyiv-Mohyla Academy and the Faculty of History of Ivan Franko National University of Lviv.

From 2013 – Senior Research Officer at the Department of Foreign Sources on the History of Ukraine at the Institute of Ukrainian Archeography; at the same time, a leading researcher at the National Reserve "Sophia of Kyiv".

Initiator and one of the organizers of the jubilee conference dedicated to the 200th anniversary of Taras Shevchenko's birth "Kyivska arkheohrafichna komisiia v istorii ukrainskoho natsionalnoho vidrodzhennia", which was held on 9 October 2014 at the Institute of Ukrainian Archeography.

She speaks Ancient Greek and Latin. Hordiienko is also fond of drawing.

== Scientific achievements ==
Hordiienko is the author of more than 250 scientific publications (including in the authoritative international journal Byzantinoslavica), a participant in more than 200 scientific conferences; co-author of the book Istoriia Ukrainskoi pravoslavnoi tserkvy (2019). He established the exact date of Princess Olga's baptism.

Executive secretary of the editorial board and co-editor of the academic collections Ucrainica Mediaevalia, Nash Krym, Slavistychna zbirka, and others.

In 2013, Hordiienko defended his PhD thesis on Byzantine-Rus' relations.

Research interests: history of medieval Ukraine, state-building processes in the Ukrainian lands, Cossacks, Ukrainian emigration of the twentieth century.

== Awards ==
- Jubilee Certificate of Honor of the Presidium of the National Academy of Sciences of Ukraine (2018)
- thanks to the Hetman Museum (2018)
- Diploma of the participant of the top 10 rating in the nomination "Sources of Biography" of the All-Ukrainian Library "Biographical Rating-2017" Vernadsky National Library of Ukraine (2018)
