= Ponornytsia =

Rural locality in Chernihiv Oblast, Ukraine

Ponornytsia Понорниця
- Rural settlement
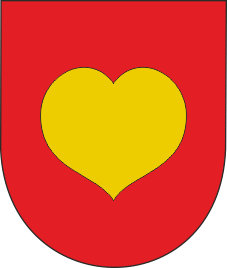
- Coat of arms

- Location within Chernihiv Oblast Location within Ukraine
- Coordinates: 51°43′22″N 32°50′46″E
- Country: Ukraine
- Oblast: Chernihiv Oblast
- Raion: Novhorod-Siverskyi Raion

Population (2022)
  - Total: 1,931
- Time zone: UTC+2 (EET)
  - Summer (DST): UTC+3 (EEST)

Ponornytsia (Ukrainian: Понорниця; Russian: Понорница) is a rural settlement in Novhorod-Siverskyi Raion, Chernihiv Oblast, northern Ukraine. It hosts the administration of Ponornytsia settlement hromada, one of the hromadas of Ukraine. Population: 1,931 (2022 estimate).

The settlement is located on the banks of the Bahachka River, in the drainage basin of the Desna. It lies on the western border of Mezynskyi National Nature Park.

== History ==
Until 18 July 2020, Ponornytsia belonged to Korop Raion. The raion was abolished in July 2020 as part of the administrative reform of Ukraine, which reduced the number of raions of Chernihiv Oblast to five. The area of Korop Raion was merged into Novhorod-Siverskyi Raion.

Until 26 January 2024, Ponornytsia was designated urban-type settlement. On this day, a new law entered into force which abolished this status, and Ponornytsia became a rural settlement.

== Economy ==
=== Transportation ===
Ponornytsia has a road access to Highway M02 which connects Kyiv with Hlukhiv and with the Russian border, as well as to Highway H27, connecting Chernihiv and Novhorod-Siverskyi.

== Notable residents ==
- Dmytro Hordiienko (born 1977), Ukrainian historian, source specialist, scientist.
