= Radichev =

Radichev may refer to:

- Radychiv, a village in Ukraine
- Anton Radichev (born 1947), Bulgarian actor
