= Hremiach =

Hremiach Грем'яч
- Village
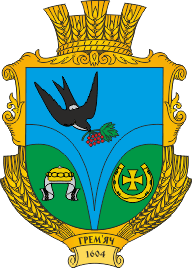
- Seal
- Interactive map of Hremiach
- Location of Hremiach Hremiach (Ukraine)
- Coordinates: 52°20′04″N 33°17′19″E
- Country: Ukraine
- Oblast: Chernihiv Oblast
- Raion: Novhorod-Siverskyi Raion
- Founded: 1604

Area
  - Total: 5.57 km^{2} (2.15 sq mi)
- Elevation: 145 m (476 ft)

Population (2001 census)
  - Total: 1,399
  - Density: 251/km^{2} (651/sq mi)
- Time zone: UTC+2 (EET)
  - Summer (DST): UTC+3 (EEST)
- Postal code: 16020
- Area code: +380 4658

Hremiach (Ukrainian: Грем'яч) is a village in Novhorod-Siverskyi Raion, Chernihiv Oblast, northern Ukraine. The village is the northernmost point of Ukraine. It belongs to Novhorod-Siverskyi urban hromada, one of the hromadas of Ukraine.

Hremiach is located on the Subost river near its confluence with the Desna. Historically, it has also been known as Hremiache (Гремʼяче). The village used to be a district centre.

On November 15, 2024, Russian Forces crossed the border seized the villages of Muravi, Novoselivka and Kolos and planted a Russian flag on the outskirts of Hremiach before retreating. By the next day the flags had been dismantled by Ukrainian forces.
