= Shabalyniv =

Shabalyniv Шабалинів
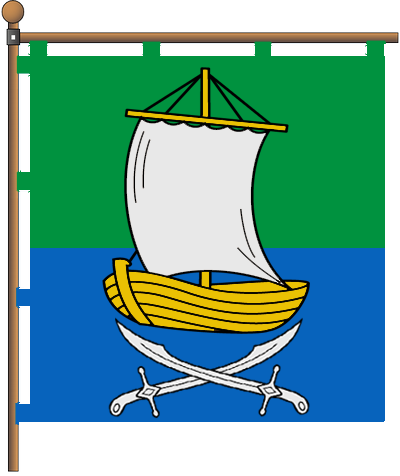
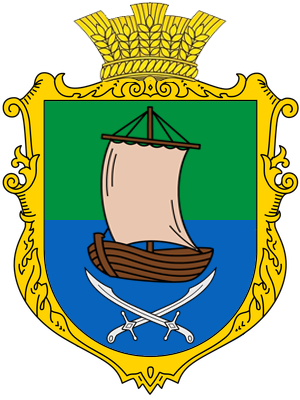
- Flag Coat of arms
- Interactive map of Shabalyniv
- Location in Ukraine Shabalyniv (Ukraine)
- Coordinates: 51°31′N 32°50′E
- Country: Ukraine
- Oblast: Chernihiv Oblast
- Raion: Novhorod-Siverskyi Raion
- Village founded: 1684

Population (2001)
  - Total: 1,646
  - Density: 250.49/km^{2} (648.8/sq mi)
- Time zone: UTC+2 (EET)
  - Summer (DST): UTC+3 (EEST)
- Postal code: 16242
- Area code: +380 4656

Shabalyniv (Ukrainian: Шабалинів) is a village in Novhorod-Siverskyi Raion (district) of Chernihiv Oblast (province) in northern Ukraine. It belongs to Korop urban hromada, one of the hromadas of Ukraine. It has a population of about 922 people.

== History ==
The village was founded in the 17th century, although remains have been found locally that go back to the Bronze Age.

Until 18 July 2020, Shabalyniv belonged to Korop Raion. The raion was abolished in July 2020 as part of the administrative reform of Ukraine, which reduced the number of raions of Chernihiv Oblast to five. The area of Korop Raion was merged into Novhorod-Siverskyi Raion.

== People ==
The village is known for its association with Joseph Popov and his wife Vera Bogdanovskaya Popova. Vera was active in introducing both education and medicine into the village as well as being one of the first female chemists. She is also thought to be one of the first women to give her live for chemistry when she blew herself up whilst trying to create a chemical which is now known to be unstable. She is buried in the village and there is a monument to her that was built in 1897.

Shabalyniv was also home to Fedir Dudko who was a writer and journalist born here in 1885. He wrote under the pseudonyms Odud F. Karpenko. He died in New York in 1962.
