= Gordeyev =

Gordeyev or Gordeev (feminine: Gordeyeva/Gordeeva, Russian: Гордеев / Гордеевa) is a Russian-language patronymic surname derived from the given name Gordey, a variant of Gordianus/Gordian. Notable people with this surname include:

- Alexey Gordeyev (born 1955), Russian politician
- Andrei Gordeyev (born 1975), Russian professional football coach and former player
- Artyom Gordeyev (born 1988), Russian ice hockey player
- Ekaterina Gordeeva (born 1971), Russian figure skater
- Fyodor Gordeyev (1744–1810), Russian sculptor
- Irina Gordeeva (born 1986), Russian high jumper
- Katerina Gordeeva (born 1977), Russian journalist
- Sergei Gordeev (born 1972), Russian billionaire property developer
- Tatyana Gordeyeva (born 1973), Russian heptathlete
- Valery Gordeev (born 1952), Soviet motorcycle speedway rider
- Vladimir Gordeev (born 1950), Soviet motorcycle speedway rider
- Yulia Gordeeva (born 1988), Russian footballer

== See also ==
- Foma Gordeyev, a novel
- Foma Gordeyev (film)
