= Vyshenky, Chernihiv Oblast =

Rural locality in Chernihv Oblast, Ukraine

Vyshenky Вишеньки
- Village
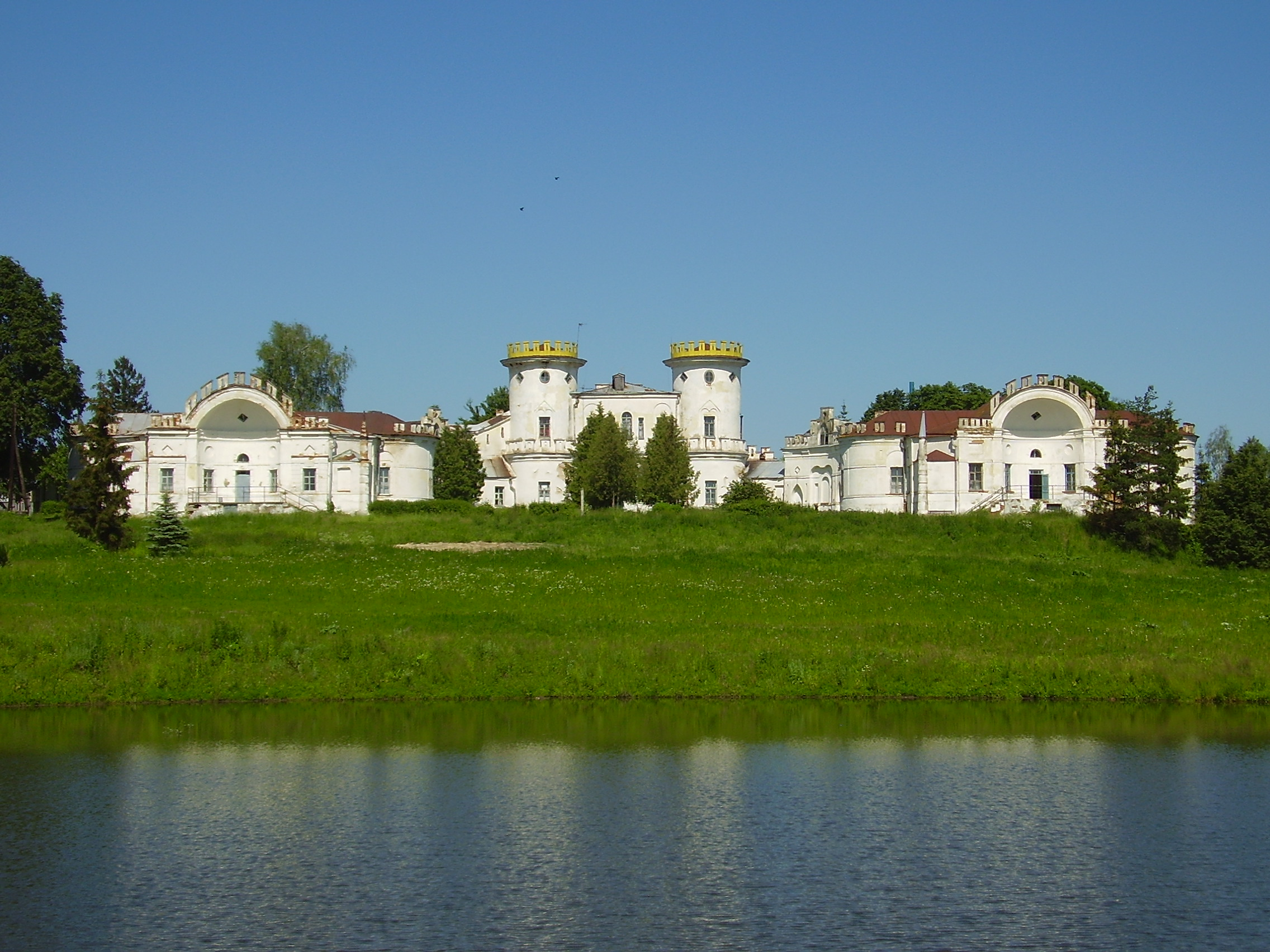
- Palace of Rumyantsev-Zadunaisky

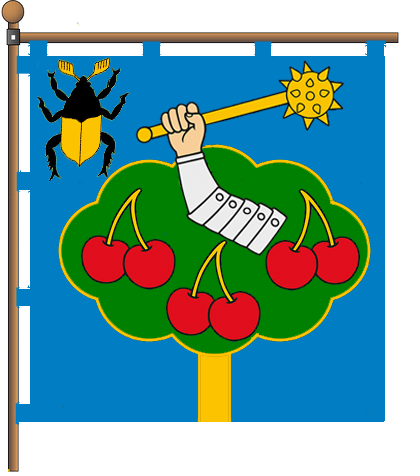
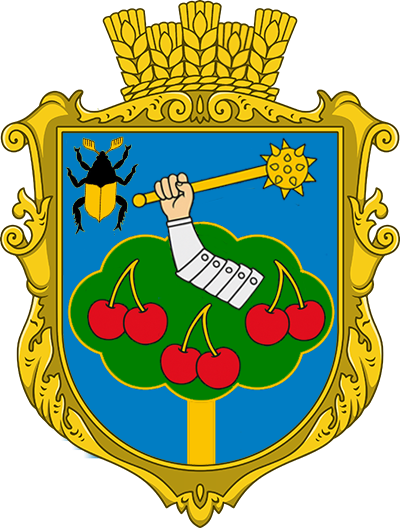
- Flag Coat of arms
- Interactive map of Vyshenky
- Location within Chernihiv Oblast Location within Ukraine
- Coordinates: 51.643°N 33.063°E
- Country: Ukraine
- Oblast: Chernihiv Oblast
- Raion: Novhorod-Siverskyi Raion
- Hromada: Korop settlement hromada

Population
  - Total: 500

Vyshenky (Ukrainian: Вишеньки; Russian: Вишенки, romanized: Vishenki; German: Wischenka; also called Vishenka in connection with the Hutterites) is a small village in Novhorod-Siverskyi Raion, Chernihiv Oblast, Ukraine. The population is about 500 people. The village is located on the right bank of the Desna River. It belongs to Korop urban hromada, one of the hromadas of Ukraine.

The village played an important role in the history of the Hutterites as all Hutterites lived there from 1770 to 1802. They were invited to settle there by Peter Alexandrovich Rumyantsev-Zadunaisky (1725–1796), a Russian general, who was governor of Ukraine.

Until 18 July 2020, Vyshenky belonged to Korop Raion. The raion was abolished in July 2020 as part of the administrative reform of Ukraine, which reduced the number of raions of Chernihiv Oblast to five. The area of Korop Raion was merged into Novhorod-Siverskyi Raion.
