= Semenivka, Chernihiv Oblast =

City in Chernihiv Oblast, Ukraine

Semenivka Семенівка
- City
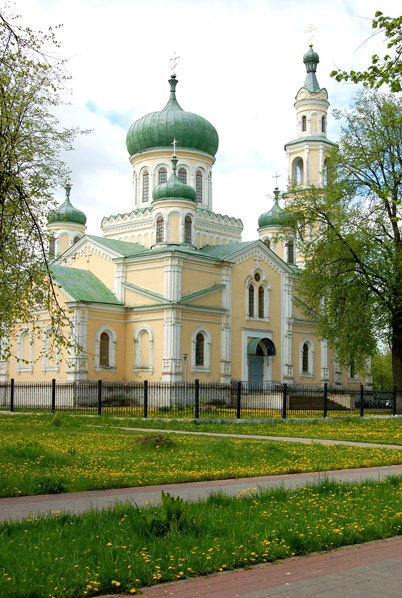
- Church of Our Lady of Kazan

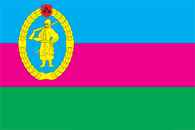
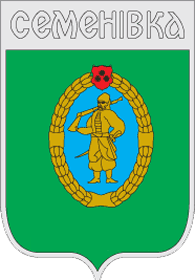
- Flag Coat of arms

- Location within Chernihiv Oblast Location within Ukraine
- Coordinates: 52°10′30″N 32°34′40″E
- Country: Ukraine
- Oblast: Chernihiv Oblast
- Raion: Novhorod-Siverskyi Raion
- Hromada: Semenivka urban hromada
- Founded: 1680

Area
  - Total: 6,751 ha (16,680 acres)
- Elevation (center): 252 m (827 ft)

Population (2022)
  - Total: 7,792
  - Estimate (September 2023): 5,600
  - Density: 115.4/km^{2} (298.9/sq mi)
- Time zone: UTC+2 (EET)
  - Summer (DST): UTC+3 (EEST)
- Postal codes: 15400, 15401
- Area code(s): +380 (4659)
- ISO 3166 code: UA-74
- Vehicle registration plates: CB
- KOATUU: 7424710100
- Website: Semenivka rada

Semenivka (Ukrainian: Семенівка, pronounced [seˈmɛn⁽ʲ⁾iu̯kɐ]; Russian: Семёновка, romanized: Semyonovka) is a small city in Novhorod-Siverskyi Raion, Chernihiv Oblast (province) of Ukraine. It hosts the administration of Semenivka urban hromada, one of the hromadas of Ukraine. Population: 7,792 (2022 estimate).

== History ==
Semenivka was founded as a Cossack sloboda in 1680 by Colonel of Starodub Regiment Semen Samoilovych, son of Ukrainian Hetman Ivan Samoilovych, and was privately owned by him and his descendants until 1861. Because of the advantageous border location and good talent in the households of Semenivka, the town rapidly increased in population, eventually becoming center of the parish which included the surrounding villages. During the 19th century Semenivka was a volost town of Novozybkov povit of Chernigov Governorate and a centre of tanning industry.

The city of Semenivka was the administrative center of the Semenivka Raion within the Chernihiv Oblast. The Semenivka Raion was created in September 26, 1926. In 1932 the Semenivka Raion became a part of the Chernihiv Oblast and gained the status of a city in 1958. The Semenivka Raion was located in the northeastern part of the Chernihiv Oblast. It bordered Novhorod-Siverskyi Raion and Koriukivka Raion of Chernihiv Oblast, and the Starodubsky District of the Bryansk Raion in Russia. The structure of the Semenivka Raion had 17 rural councils. The area of Semenivka Rayon was 1470 kilometers and the population was approximately 18,000 inhabitants. However, the population of the city of Semenivka as of January 1, 2016 was 8,318 people.

Until 18 July 2020, Semenivka was the administrative center of Semenivka Raion. The raion was abolished in July 2020 as part of the administrative reform of Ukraine, which reduced the number of raions of Chernihiv Oblast to five. The area of Semenivka Raion was merged into Novhorod-Siverskyi Raion.

On 21 August 2023 the building of Semenivka City Council was partially destroyed by Russian attack with Shahed drone.

== Geography ==
In the eastern part of the city Semenivka is the river Revna, the left tributary of the Snov River. The river Drest (or Drost) runs through the area from north to south.

Soils on the territory Semenivka are sod-podzolic and peat bog. The average soil fertility score on a 100-point scale has a composition of 37 points. Surrounding Semenivka are peat marshes that have some local industrial interest. 20% of the city's territory and 36% percent of the Semenivka Raion is occupied by pine forests. In these pine forests are a significant planting of birch, pine, oak and other trees. The area also has diverse fauna such as 60 species of mammals, 276 species of birds, 3 species of snakes, 12 species of amphibians, 30 species of fish and numerous species of insects. On the river Drest there is a man-made waterway in the natural channel with an area of 5 hectares of surface water.

=== Climate ===
The area has a temperate continental climate, formed mainly by Atlantic air masses. It is one of the wettest areas in Ukraine, with yearly rainfalls averaging 56 cm. Average temperature for the year is 5.7 degrees. Absolute maximum summer temperature is 41.4 °C, and the absolute minimum winter temperature is -37 °C Celsius.

Climate data for Semenivka, Chernihiv Oblast (1981–2010)
Month	Jan	Feb	Mar	Apr	May	Jun	Jul	Aug	Sep	Oct	Nov	Dec	Year
Mean daily maximum °C (°F)	−2.5 (27.5)	−1.9 (28.6)	3.9 (39.0)	13.1 (55.6)	20.2 (68.4)	23.3 (73.9)	25.5 (77.9)	24.6 (76.3)	18.2 (64.8)	11.0 (51.8)	2.8 (37.0)	−1.5 (29.3)	11.4 (52.5)
Daily mean °C (°F)	−5.2 (22.6)	−5.2 (22.6)	−0.1 (31.8)	7.7 (45.9)	14.0 (57.2)	17.3 (63.1)	19.2 (66.6)	18.0 (64.4)	12.5 (54.5)	6.6 (43.9)	0.5 (32.9)	−4.0 (24.8)	6.8 (44.2)
Mean daily minimum °C (°F)	−8.0 (17.6)	−8.4 (16.9)	−3.8 (25.2)	2.8 (37.0)	8.0 (46.4)	11.6 (52.9)	13.4 (56.1)	12.2 (54.0)	7.7 (45.9)	2.9 (37.2)	−2.2 (28.0)	−6.5 (20.3)	2.5 (36.5)
Average precipitation mm (inches)	39.6 (1.56)	38.8 (1.53)	34.0 (1.34)	39.1 (1.54)	56.5 (2.22)	74.1 (2.92)	84.3 (3.32)	63.4 (2.50)	66.6 (2.62)	51.5 (2.03)	50.2 (1.98)	44.5 (1.75)	642.6 (25.30)
Average precipitation days (≥ 1.0 mm)	10.1	9.6	9.0	7.5	8.7	10.2	10.2	7.8	9.0	8.6	9.6	9.8	110.1
Average relative humidity (%)	85.7	83.2	78.5	71.0	68.7	73.5	74.6	74.1	79.1	82.9	87.7	84.5	78.6
Source: World Meteorological Organization

== Demographics ==
As of January 1, 2024, population of Semenivka totaled ~9,850 residents with 3644 men and 6202 women. As of January 1, 2016, the age composition of Semenivka is the following, from 0 to 19 years: 1692 inhabitants; from 20–35 years: 1780 residents; from 35–60, 3061 residents; from 60–70 years: 452; from ages 70 years and older registered unemployed: 778 residents; Officially-155 residents; and from this group 3167 residents are Pensioners.

== Economy ==
The state-run Semenivka Forestry Company, a private local company, and several private sawmills are in operation. There is a factory which sews footwear and bedding sets. Irvantsevskyi Peat factory is located in the village of Second Angles near the Seminivka and the Seminivka City Council, which produces peat briquettes.

The Semenivka agricultural enterprise Agro is the largest agribusiness in the area. In the agricultural sectors are Semenovskoe Cereal and Semenov Rayahrohim, having a partnership with private farmers. There is a powered Semenivka railway station and bus transportation is carried out by several private entities.

== Culture ==
The Day of the City is September 21.

== Government ==
The mayor of the city is Serhiy Dedenko as of 2020.
