= Saint Gordianus (disambiguation) =

Saint Gordianus may refer to:

- Saint Gordianus (died 362), commemorated 10 May, Roman martyr
- Saint Gordianus (commemorated 17 September), who suffered martyrdom (place uncertain) with two companions
- Saint Gordianus (commemorated 13 September), who with several companions was martyred in Pontus or Galatia
