= Novhorod-Siverskyi urban hromada =

Urban hromada of Chernihiv Oblast, Ukraine

Novhorod-Siverskyi urban hromada Новгород-Сіверська міська громада
- Hromada
- Coat of arms
- Interactive map of Novhorod-Siverskyi urban hromada
- Country: Ukraine
- Oblast: Chernihiv
- Raion: Novhorod-Siverskyi

Area
  - Total: 1,803.5 km^{2} (696.3 sq mi)

Population (2023)
  - Total: 34,725
  - Density: 19.254/km^{2} (49.868/sq mi)
- Settlements: 85
- Cities: 1
- Villages: 84
- Website: ns-mrada.cg.gov.ua

Novhorod-Siverskyi urban territorial hromada (Ukrainian: Новгород-Сіверська міська територіальна громада, romanized: Novhorod-Siverska miska terytorialna hromada) is one of the hromadas of Ukraine, located in Novhorod-Siverskyi Raion within Chernihiv Oblast. Its capital is the city of Novhorod-Siverskyi.

The hromada has a total area of 1,803.5 km^{2} (696.3 mi^{2}), as well as a population of 34,725 (as of 2023).

Prior to its current state, Novhorod-Siverskyi urban hromada was founded on 31 August 2018 as an amalgamated hromada. It was expanded as part of decentralisation in Ukraine.

== Composition ==
In addition to one city (Novhorod-Siverskyi) and one rural-type settlement (Krasna Hirka), the hromada includes 83 villages:

- Arapovychi
- Arshuky
- Berezova Hat
- Byryne
- Blystova
- Bohdanove, Chernihiv Oblast
- Buhrynivka
- Budo-Vorobivska
- Budyshche
- Buchky, Chernihiv Oblast
- Chaikyne
- Chernatske
- Chulativ
- Dibrova
- Dihtiarivka
- Drobyshiv
- Hai
- Hirky
- Hnativka
- Horbove
- Horodyshche
- Hremiach
- Faivka
- Forostovychi
- Fursove
- Kamin
- Kamianska Sloboda
- Karabany
- Klevyn
- Kovpynka
- Kolos
- Koman
- Krasnyi Khutir
- Kremskyi Buhor
- Krolevets-Slobidka
- Kudlaivka, Chernihiv Oblast
- Kuzmynske
- Kyselivka
- Larynivka
- Lenkiv
- Lyzunivka
- Liskonohy
- Lomanka
- Loska
- Mamekyne
- Mykhailivka
- Mykhalchyna-Sloboda
- Movchaniv
- Muraveinyk
- Muravi
- Novenke
- Novoselivka
- Obiednane
- Orlivka
- Osove
- Pecheniuhy
- Pidhirne
- Poliushkyne
- Popivka
- Prokopivka
- Putyvsk
- Pushkari
- Rohivka
- Roshcha
- Sapozhkiv Khutir
- Slobidka
- Smiach
- Soloviv
- Stakhorshchyna
- Studynka
- Troitske
- Uzrui
- Ushivka
- Sheptaky
- Velykyi Hai
- Vnutrishnii Bir
- Volodymyrivka
- Vorobivka
- Vostochne
- Vylchyky
- Yasna Poliana
- Yasne
- Yukhnove

== See also ==
- List of hromadas of Ukraine
