= Korop Raion =

Former subdivision of Chernihiv Oblast, Ukraine

Korop Raion Коропський район
- Raion
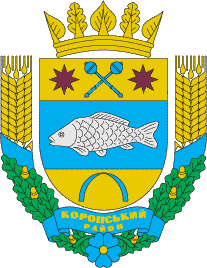
- Flag Coat of arms
- Interactive map of Korop Raion
- Coordinates: 51°35′26″N 32°56′50″E
- Country: Ukraine
- Oblast: Chernihiv Oblast
- Disestablished: 18 July 2020
- Admin. center: Korop

Area
  - Total: 1,312 km^{2} (507 sq mi)

Population (2020)
  - Total: 21,620
  - Density: 19.3/km^{2} (50/sq mi)
- Time zone: UTC+2 (EET)
  - Summer (DST): UTC+3 (EEST)
- Website: http://kpadm.cg.gov.ua/

Korop Raion (Ukrainian: Коропський район) was a raion (district) of Chernihiv Oblast, northern Ukraine. Its administrative centre was located at the urban-type settlement of Korop. The raion was abolished on 18 July 2020 as part of the administrative reform of Ukraine, which reduced the number of raions of Chernihiv Oblast to five. The area of Korop Raion was merged into Novhorod-Siverskyi Raion. The last estimate of the raion population was 21,620 (2020 est.)

At the time of disestablishment, the raion consisted of two hromadas:

- Korop settlement hromada with the administration in Korop;
- Ponornytsia settlement hromada with the administration in the urban-type settlement of Ponornytsia.

The raion contained the village of Shabalyniv.
