= Chaikyne, Chernihiv Oblast =

Chaikyne Чайкине
- Village
- Interactive map of Chaikyne
- Location of Chaikyne Chaikyne (Ukraine)
- Coordinates: 52°10′03″N 32°59′47″E
- Country: Ukraine
- Oblast: Chernihiv Oblast
- Raion: Novhorod-Siverskyi Raion
- Hromada: Novhorod-Siverskyi urban hromada
- Founded: 1750

Area
  - Total: 0.52 km^{2} (0.20 sq mi)
- Elevation: 180 m (590 ft)

Population (2001 census)
  - Total: 296
  - Estimate (2024): 186
  - Density: 570/km^{2} (1,500/sq mi)
- Time zone: UTC+2 (EET)
  - Summer (DST): UTC+3 (EEST)
- Postal code: 16014
- Area code: +380 4658

Chaikyne (Ukrainian: Чайкине) is a village located in the Novhorod-Siverskyi Raion in the Chernihiv Oblast of northern Ukraine. It forms part of the Novhorod-Siverskyi urban hromada, one of the hromadas of Ukraine.

== History ==
On 12 June 2020, in accordance with the decree of the Cabinet of Ministers of Ukraine No. 730-r "On the determination of administrative centers and approval of the territories of territorial communities of Chernihiv Oblast", Chaikyne became part of the Novhorod-Siverskyi urban hromada. On 17 July 2020, as a result of the administrative-territorial reform, the village retained its place in Novhorod-Siverskyi Raion, which became larger in area.

== Geography ==
The Chaikyne is located in the north of Ukraine, in the north-eastern part of Chernihiv Oblast, within the Novgorod-Siverskyi Raion. Chaikyne is located on the slopes of the Dnieper Lowland, on the Desna basin, the left tributary of the Dnieper.

The climate is moderately continental. Winter is cool, summer is not hot. The average temperature in July is +19 °C, in January -7.5 °C. The maximum precipitation falls in the summer in the form of rain. The average annual amount is from 650 to 700 mm, changing from west to east.

The Chaikyne located in the natural zone of mixed forests, in Polissia. Among the trees in the forests, pines, oaks dominate. The most common soils in the area are podzol soils.

== Attractions ==
At the entrance to Chaikyne there is a memorial sign, the inscription on which reads: "Chaikyne is the birthplace of the President of Ukraine Leonid Kuchma". Also in the village, there is a monument to the soldiers of the Red Army who died in World War II and a large Orthodox cathedral built during the presidency of Leonid Kuchma.

== Notable people ==
Chaikyne is the birthplace of Leonid Kuchma, the second president of Ukraine.
