= Saint Gordianus (commemorated 13 September) =

Saint Gordianus (commemorated 13 September), who with several companions was martyred in Pontus or Galatia.
