= Chaikyne, Dzhankoi Raion, Crimea =

Chaikyne
- Village
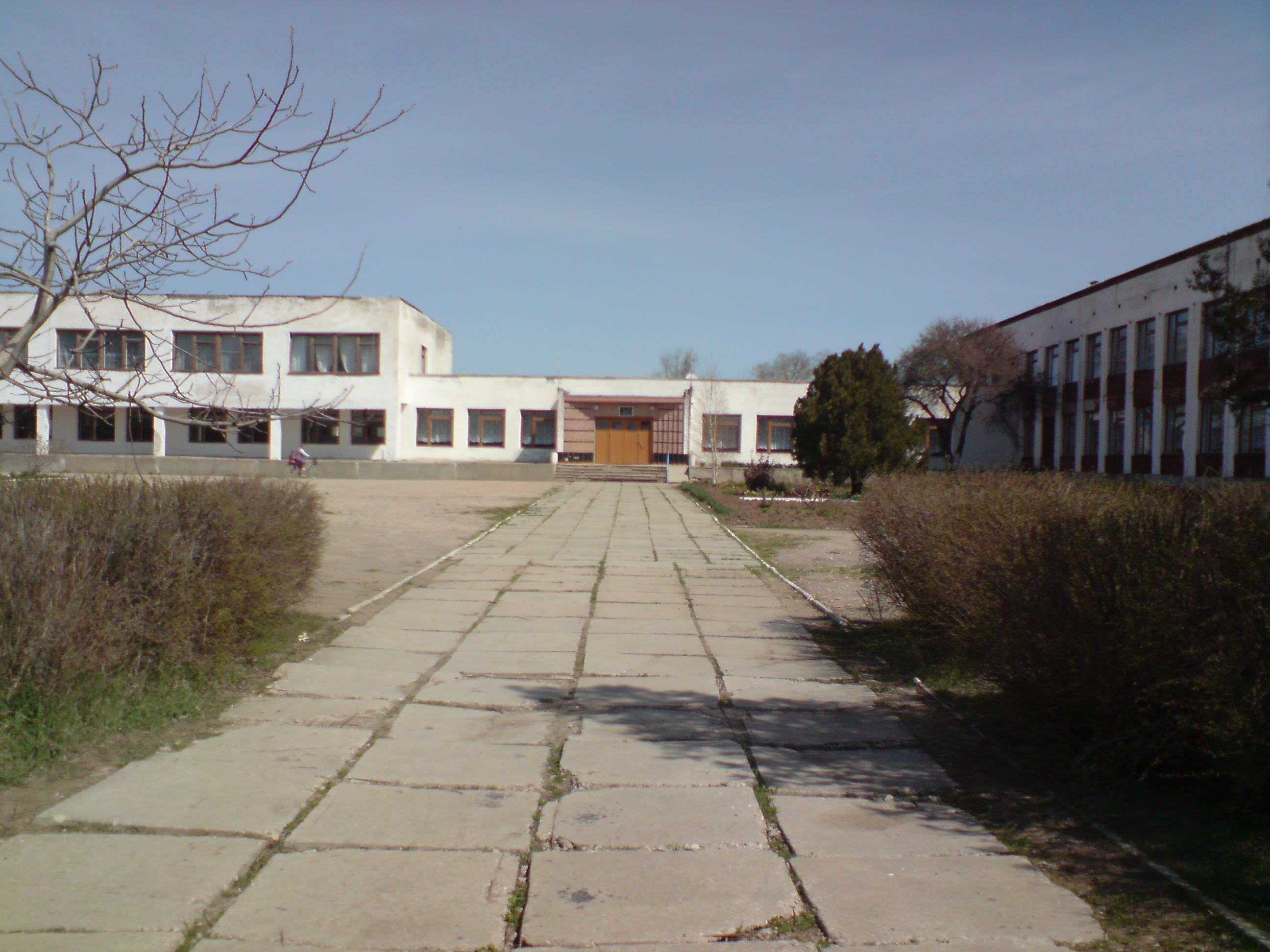

- Location within Crimea
- Coordinates: 45°48′50″N 34°35′37″E
- Country: Disputed: Ukraine (de jure); Russia (de facto)
- Region: (Autonomous Republic of Crimea) Crimea^{1}
- Municipality: Dzhankoi
- Elevation: 8 m (26 ft)

Population (2014)
  - Total: 1,011
- Time zone: UTC+4 (MSK)
- ^{1} Autonomous Republic of Crimea (de jure) or Republic of Crimea (de facto), depending on jurisdiction.

Chaikyne (Ukrainian: Чайкине; Russian: Чайкино; Crimean Tatar: Küçük Tarhan) is a village located in Dzhankoi Raion, Crimea. Population: 1,011 (2014 Census).

== Demographics ==
As of the 2001 Ukrainian census, the settlement had a population of 1,119 inhabitants. Despite the settlement being predominantly Russophone, it is estimated that ethnic Ukrainians constitute a slim majority in the settlement, followed by large minorities of Russians and Crimean Tatars, as well as smaller Belarusians and Gypsy communities. The exact native language composition was as follows:

Native languages in Chaikyne
	percent
Russian	40.1%
Crimean Tatar	35.7%
Ukrainian	20.9%
Belarusian	2.0%
Romani	0.1%
others	0.4%

== See also ==
- Dzhankoi Raion
