= Saint Gordianus (commemorated 17 September) =

Saint Gordianus, commemorated 17 September, suffered martyrdom (place uncertain) with two companions
