= Korop =

Rural locality in Chernihiv Oblast, Ukraine

Korop Короп
- Rural settlement
- Voznesenska Street, with St. Elijah Church on the left and Ascension Church on the right

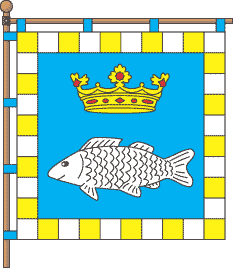
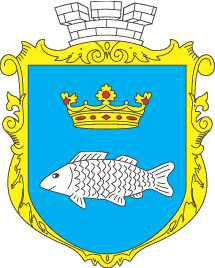
- Flag Coat of arms

- Location within Chernihiv Oblast Location within Ukraine
- Coordinates: 51°34′N 32°58′E
- Country: Ukraine
- Oblast: Chernihiv Oblast
- Raion: Novhorod-Siverskyi Raion
- Hromada: Korop settlement hromada

Korop (Ukrainian: Короп) is a rural settlement in Novhorod-Siverskyi Raion, Chernihiv Oblast, northern Ukraine. It hosts the administration of Korop settlement hromada, one of the hromadas of Ukraine. Population is 4,490 (2022 estimate).

== Name ==
The name of the settlement means "carp" in Ukrainian, and the fish is present in the coat of arms and flag of the settlement.

== History ==
Until 18 July 2020, Korop was the administrative center of Korop Raion. The raion was abolished in July 2020 as part of the administrative reform of Ukraine, which reduced the number of raions of Chernihiv Oblast to five. The area of Korop Raion was merged into Novhorod-Siverskyi Raion.

Until 26 January 2024, Korop was designated urban-type settlement. On this day, a new law entered into force which abolished this status, and Korop became a rural settlement.

== Geography ==
The Korop is located in the north of Ukraine, in the north-eastern part of Chernihiv Oblast, in the Novgorod-Siverskyi Raion. Korop is located on the slopes of the Dnieper Lowland, on the Desna River, the left tributary of the Dnieper.

The climate is moderately continental. Winter is cool, summer is not hot. The average temperature in July is +19 °C, in January -7.5 °C. The maximum precipitation falls in the summer in the form of rain. The average annual amount is from 650 to 700 mm, changing from west to east.

The Korop located in the natural zone of mixed forests, in Polissya. Among the trees in the forests, oaks, lindens, and maples dominate. The most common soils in the area are podzol soils.

The settlement of Korop is located next to the Mezyn National Park.

== Notable people ==
- Nikolai Kibalchich, a Russian revolutionary, the main explosive expert who took part in the assassination of Tsar Alexander II of Russia;
- Demian Mnohohrishny, the hetman of Left-bank Ukraine from 1669 to 1672;
- Sergei Rudenko, a Soviet marshal of aviation
