= Serhii Gordiienko =

Ukrainian boxing coach (born 1971)

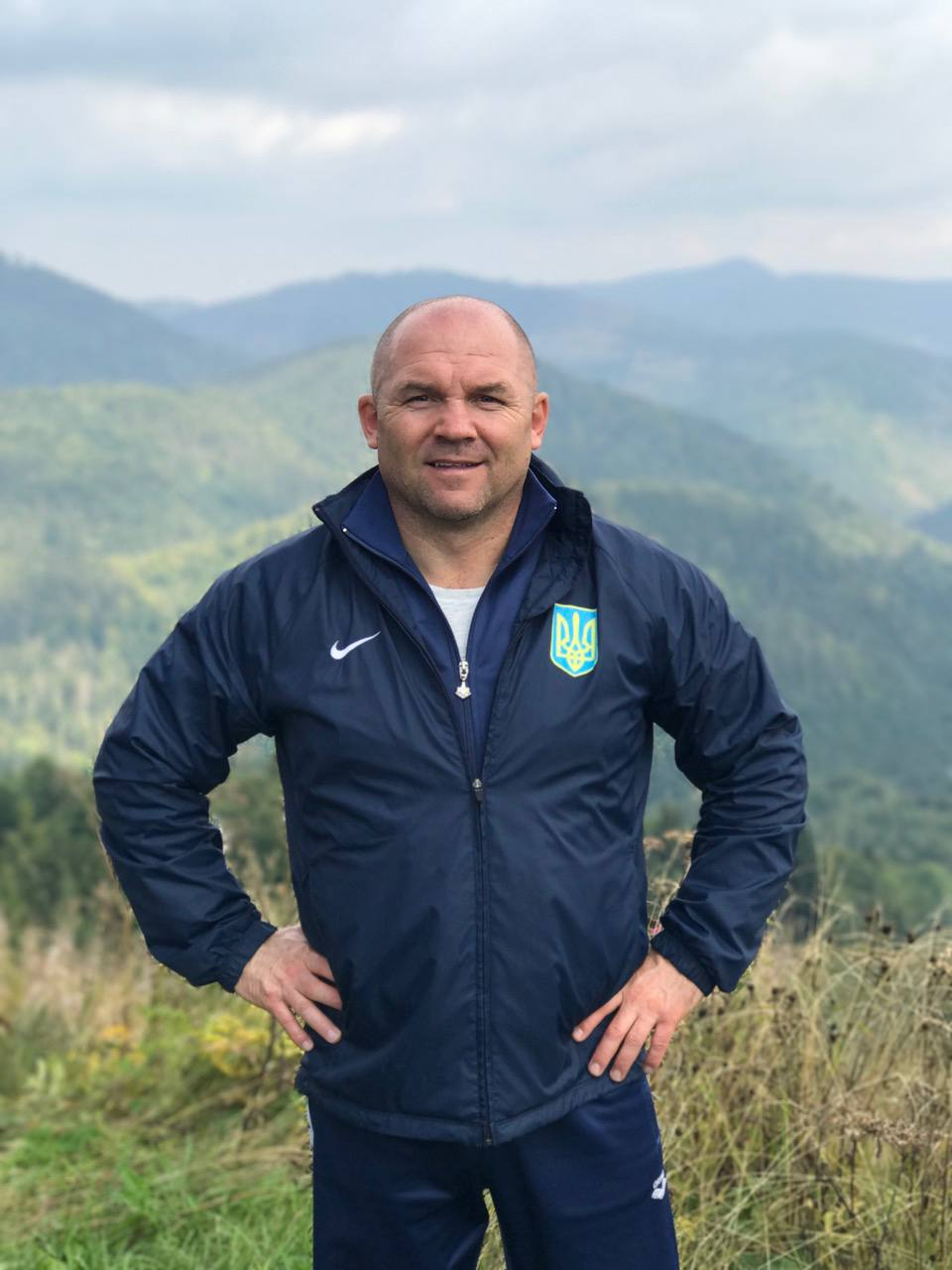
- Born: Serhii Volodymyrovych Gordiienko; 7 May 1971 (age 54); Kyiv, Ukrainian SSR, Soviet Union

Serhii Volodymyrovych Gordiienko (Ukrainian: Сергій Володимирович Гордієнко; born 7 May 1971) is a Ukrainian boxing trainer. Head coach of the women national boxing team of Ukraine from 2013 to 2021. Coach of professional boxers Max Bursak and Dmitro Nikulin. Personal coach of the Women's World Boxing Champion (Honored Master of Sports of Ukraine) Maria Badulina-Bova.

He is Honored Coach of Ukraine and Honored Worker of Physical Culture and Sports of Ukraine.

== Biography ==
Gordiienko was born in Kyiv in the family of workers of the Kyiv State Plant "Burevisnyk". Father Volodymyr Gordiienko was engaged in boxing, candidate for Master of Sports of the USSR, brought his son to the section at the age of 9. Serhii started boxing under the guidance of Honored Coach of Ukraine Eduard Vinogradov and Honored Coach of the USSR Vladimir Kushnir.

In 1987, he won Soviet Union Youth games in Kutaisi, Georgian SSR, and received Master of Sport of the USSR title, in his 16. In the same year, he won Youth Soviet Union Championships. 4 times winner of the Ukrainian Soviet Socialist republic championships.

He was a member of the junior national team of the USSR. He fought 136 fights — 131 won.

1988 — 1992 he studied and graduated from the Kyiv State University of Physical Culture and Sports, received a diploma as a boxing coach.

Since 1992 he worked as a coach in the Voskhod sports club in Kyiv.

In 2005 he worked as a coach in the promotional company National Box Promotion.

Since 2006 he worked as a coach at the children's and youth Voskhod sports school. Where he began to train the future IBF World Youth Champion Max Bursak. Under the guidance of Serhii Gordiienko and Eduard Vinogradov, Max was included in the Ukrainian national boxing team and fulfilled the standard of Master of Sports of Ukraine. In the same gym, Serhii Gordiienko began to train girls, one of the first famous students was the master of sports of Ukraine Marina Naidich (silver medalist of the European Championships 2010 among girls). Since 2011 he began to work with the future world champion in boxing among women, multiple winner of the World and European Championships, Honored Master of Sports of Ukraine Maria Badulina-Bova. Serhii has been working with Maria for over 10 years. Also Serhii Gordiienko trained Master of Sports of International Class Angelina Bondarenko — World Junior Champion in 2013 (Bulgaria), participant of the Youth Olympic Games in 2014 (China), multiple winner of the world championships among youth.

Since 2007 he worked as a coach in the Klitschko Brothers' professional boxing promotional company called K2 Promotions Ukraine. Where he trained a number of successful professional boxers, such as: WBO European Champion Dmitro Nikulin, WBO interconcnental champion, EBU European champion Max Bursak, WBO intercontinental champion Viacheslav Uzelkov, boxing professionals Koscantyn Rovenskyi, Vadym Novopashyn, Ihor Bursak and Ihor Pankevych.

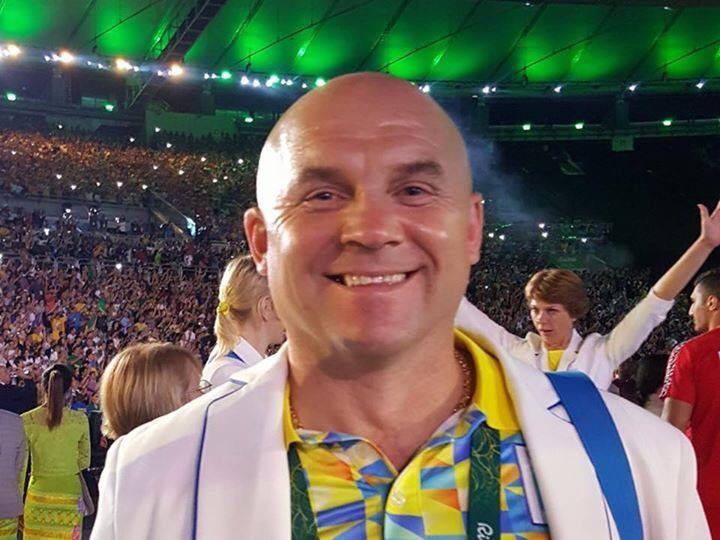
Serhii Gordiienko

Since 2013 until 2021 he was head coach of the national boxing team of Ukraine among Women Elite. In 2015, the national team of Ukraine led by Serhii Gordiienko went to the first ever European Games in Baku. In 2016, under the leadership of the senior coach of the national team Gordiienko, the member of the national team Tetyana Kob for the first time in the history of Ukraine wins a license in women's boxing for the 2016 Summer Olympics in Brazil. At the Olympic Games in Rio, Tetiana Kob loses in a very controversial fight to two-time Olympic champion Nicola Adams, taking 5th place. Having gone through a difficult period of COVID-19, Serhii Gordiienko managed to prepare the team and at the 2020 Summer Olympics in Tokyo, the women's national team of Ukraine consolidated the results of the previous games and was represented by one athlete Anna Lysenko, who lost in a fierce battle to two-time world champion Turkish Busenaz Sürmeneli, taking 5th place. During the work of Serhii Gordiienko as the head coach of the national team, the team under his leadership brought to the country's treasury more than 20 medals of various tests from the World and European Championships. Also under the leadership of Gordiienko trained famous Ukrainian amateur boxers: Master of Sports of International Class, mulcple champion of Ukraine Yuliia Tsyplakova, Master of Sports of International Class, multiple champion of Ukraine Snizhana Kholodkova, Master of Sports of International Class, winner of the European Championship, multiple champion of Ukraine Ivanna Krupenia. Today Sergey continues to work as Maria Bova's personal trainer. In October 2022, Maria Bova under the guidance of Sergei Gordienko became a finalist of the European Women Championships in Budva, Montenegro.

Serhii Gordiienko has 3 stars AIBA, a diploma of the highest category coach of Ukraine.

He is married and has 2 children. Daughter — Anastasia, son — Maksym (Master of Sports in boxing, bronze medalist of the Ukrainian Youth Championship).

== Personal trainees ==
1. Max Bursak — IBF World Youth Champion 2008, WBO Interconcnental Champion 2009, EBU European Champion 2013. 45 fights - 37 wins - 2 draws.
2. Dmitro Nikulin — WBO European Champion 2009. 30 fights - 29 wins.
3. Viacheslav Uzelkov — IBO Internaconal Champion 2013. 34 fights - 30 wins.
4. Maria Badulina-Bova — world champion among women (elite) 2012 (China), silver medalist of the European Women's Championship (elite) 2011 (Netherlands), 2x bronze medalist of the European Women's Championship (elite) — 2018, 2019 (Bulgaria, Spain), silver medalist of the world championship 2018 (India), silver medalist European Women's Championship (elite) — 2022 (Budva, Montenegro)
5. Angelina Bondarenko — World Junior Champion 2013 (Bulgaria), bronze medalist of the World Youth Championship (licensed to the Youth Olympic Games) 2014 (Bulgaria), participant of the Youth Olympic Games 2014 (China), silver medalist of the World Youth Women's Championship 2015 (Taipei).
6. Marina Naidich — silver medalist of the European Championship 2010 (France), bronze medalist of the European Youth Championship 2012 (Poland)

== Statistics ==
- Medals of the national team of Ukraine among women under the leadership of Serhii Gordiienko:
- 2014 Women's European Amateur Boxing Championships (Bucharest, Romania) — 1 gold, 1 bronze medal
- 2016 Women's European Amateur Boxing Championships (Sofia, Bulgaria) — 1 silver, 1 bronze medal
- 2018 Women's European Amateur Boxing Championships (Sofia, Bulgaria) — 1 silver, 3 bronze medals
- 2019 Women's European Amateur Boxing Championships (Madrid, Spain) — 1 silver, 4 bronze medals
- 2014 AIBA Women's World Boxing Championships (Jeju City, South Korea) — 1 bronze medal
- 2018 AIBA Women's World Boxing Championships (New Delhi, India) — 2 silver medals

== Achievements ==
- Honored Coach of Ukraine
- Honored Worker of Physical Culture and Sports of Ukraine
