= Semenivka urban hromada =

Semenivka urban hromada Семенівська міська громада
- Hromada
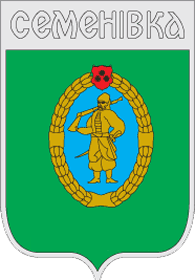
- Coat of arms
- Interactive map of Semenivka urban hromada
- Country: Ukraine
- Oblast: Chernihiv
- Raion: Novhorod-Siverskyi

Area
  - Total: 1,399.0 km^{2} (540.2 sq mi)

Population (2020)
  - Total: 15,973
  - Density: 11.417/km^{2} (29.571/sq mi)
- CATOTTG code: UA74060070000028810
- Settlements: 70
- Cities: 1
- Rural settlements: 4
- Villages: 65
- Website: semenivka-gromada.gov.ua

Semenivka urban hromada (Ukrainian: Семенівська міська громада) is a hromada of Ukraine, located in Novhorod-Siverskyi Raion, Chernihiv Oblast. Its administrative center is the city of Semenivka.

It has an area of 1,399.0 square kilometres (540.2 mi^{2}) and a population of 15,973, as of 2020.

== Composition ==
The hromada contains 70 settlements: 1 city (Semenivka), 65 villages:

- Arkhipivka
- Baranivka
- Berezovyi Hai
- Bleshnya
- Bobryk Druhy
- Bronyvy
- Vilkhivka
- Vilshanka
- Halahanivka
- Hati
- Hremyachka
- Dovzhik
- Yershov
- Zhadanivka
- Zhadov
- Zalizniy Myst
- Zarechye
- Zeleny Hai
- Zorya
- Ivanine
- Ivanivka
- Kalinivske
- Karasi
- Karpovychi
- Kozylivshchyna
- Kostobobriv
- Krasni Lozy
- Kryvusha
- Krynychki
- Kryulki
- Kuty Druhy
- Leonivka
- Liskivshchyna
- Losevochka
- Losivka
- Lubnya
- Lubyane
- Maksymikhine
- Mars
- Masheve
- Medvedivka
- Mykolaivka
- Mkhy
- Naberezhne
- Oleksandrivka
- Orlykivka
- Pohoriltsi
- Pokrovske
- Prohres
- Rakuta
- Selishche
- Serhiivske
- Stara Hutka
- Skhidne
- Tymonovichi
- Topolivka
- Turove
- Ferubky
- Frola
- Khandobokivka
- Khotiivka
- Chornyi Rih
- Chornozem
- Shvedchyna
- Yanzhulivka

And 4 rural-type settlements: Hasoprovidne, Zelena Roscha, Ivanput, and Potvornyi.

== See also ==
- List of hromadas of Ukraine
