= Korop settlement hromada =

Korop settlement hromada Коропська селищна громада
- Hromada
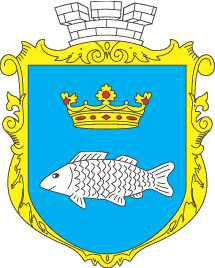
- Coat of arms
- Interactive map of Korop settlement hromada
- Country: Ukraine
- Oblast: Chernihiv
- Raion: Novhorod-Siverskyi

Area
  - Total: 910.1 km^{2} (351.4 sq mi)

Population (2020)
  - Total: 15,506
  - Density: 17.04/km^{2} (44.13/sq mi)
- CATOTTG code: UA74060010000052907
- Settlements: 50
- Rural settlements: 3
- Villages: 46
- Towns: 1
- Website: koropska-gromada.gov.ua

Korop settlement hromada (Ukrainian: Коропська селищна громада) is a hromada of Ukraine, located in Novhorod-Siverskyi Raion, Chernihiv Oblast. Its administrative center is the town of Korop.

It has an area of 910.1 square kilometres (351.4 mi^{2}) and a population of 15,506, as of 2020. A characteristic feature of the community is its low population density (approximately 17 people per km^{2}).

== Composition ==
The hromada includes 50 settlements: 1 town (Korop), 46 villages:

- Atyusha
- Bilka
- Borisov
- Budyshche
- Buzhanka
- Vyshenki
- Vilne
- Halychivka
- Horodyshche
- Horokhove
- Huta
- Dribtsi
- Yehorivka
- Zhernivka
- Karatsyubyne
- Karylske
- Krasnopillya
- Kuchi
- Lebedyn
- Lubenets
- Lukniv
- Mokhove
- Nakot
- Nekryte
- Nekhaivka
- Novoselitsa
- Norytsia
- Obolonya
- Podoliaki
- Poliske
- Polyana
- Prydesnianske
- Pusta Hreblya
- Raihorodok
- Ranok
- Rybotyn
- Ryzhki
- Rozhdestvenske
- Rubannik
- Sinyavka
- Sohachi
- Stanove
- Tarasivka
- Chereshenki
- Chornyavka
- Shabaliniv

And 3 rural-type settlements: Hrudy, Lysa Hora, and Zaitseve.

== History ==
The territory of the modern Korop hromada is a historical part of the Chernihiv-Siverskyi princely period. Remains of a settlement from the times of Kyivan Rus (10th-13th centuries) have been found on the territory of Korop. In the first half of the 18th century, the village of Korop received simplified Magdeburg law. According to the administrative reform of 1923, the Korop district was created as part of the Konotop district, and the main settlement was Korop, which received the status of an urban-type settlement.

The Korop community was formed in 2016 as a result of the merger of the Korop village council and 16 village councils of the Korop hromada. In December 2020, 2 more village councils joined the community. The first elections in the current format in the hromada were held on October 25, 2020.

== Geography ==
The hromada is located in the north of Ukraine, in the north-eastern part of Chernihiv Oblast, in the Novgorod-Siverskyi Raion. The area of the community is 910.417 km^{2}. Korop settlement hromada is located on the slopes of the Dnieper Lowland. The Desna River, the left tributary of the Dnieper, flows through the community.

The climate is moderately continental. Winter is cool, summer is not hot. The average temperature in July is +19 °C, in January -7.5 °C. The maximum precipitation falls in the summer in the form of rain. The average annual amount is from 650 to 700 mm, changing from west to east.

The hromada located in the natural zone of mixed forests, in Polissya. Among the trees in the forests, oaks, lindens, and maples dominate. Typical large mammals are elk, roe deer, wild boar, squirrels, beavers, hares and wolves. The most common soils in the area are podzol soils. Forests are an important resource of the community, they occupy 22% of the area.

The Mezyn National Park is located on the territory of the Korop settlement hromada.

== Economy ==
The main direction of economic development of the Korop settlement hromada is agriculture, forestry and the processing industry.

=== Transportation ===
The international highway M02 passes through the southern part of the Korop settlement hromada, which coincides with part of the European route E101. There is also a railway line with a freight station.

== See also ==
- List of hromadas of Ukraine
