= Vishenki, Vladimir Oblast =

Vishenki Вишенки
- Selo
- Location within Vladimir Oblast Location within Russia
- Coordinates: 56°27′N 40°17′E
- Country: Russia
- Region: Vladimir Oblast
- District: Suzdalsky District
- Time zone: UTC+3:00

Vishenki (Russian: Вишенки) is a rural locality (a selo) in Seletskoye Rural Settlement, Suzdalsky District, Vladimir Oblast, Russia. The population was 18 as of 2010. There are 2 streets.

== Geography ==
Vishenki is located 13 km northwest of Suzdal (the district's administrative centre) by road. Kistysh is the nearest rural locality.
