= Semenivka Raion, Chernihiv Oblast =

Former subdivision of Chernihiv Oblast, Ukraine

Semenivka Raion Семенівський район
- Raion
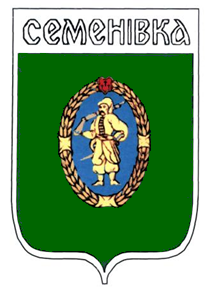
- Coat of arms

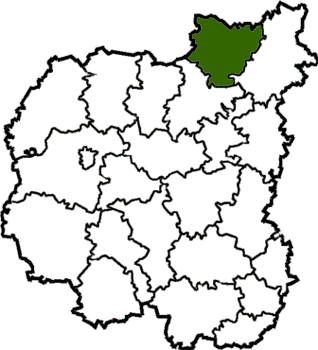
- Raion location in Chernihiv Oblast
- Interactive map of Semenivka Raion
- Coordinates: 52°7′59″N 32°37′3″E
- Country: Ukraine
- Oblast: Chernihiv Oblast
- Disestablished: 18 July 2020
- Admin. center: Semenivka

Area
  - Total: 1,470 km^{2} (570 sq mi)

Population (2020)
  - Total: 16,790
  - Density: 11.4/km^{2} (29.6/sq mi)
- Time zone: UTC+2 (EET)
  - Summer (DST): UTC+3 (EEST)
- Website: http://semadm.cg.gov.ua/

Semenivka Raion (Ukrainian: Семенівський район) was a raion (district) of Chernihiv Oblast, northern Ukraine. Its administrative centre was located at the city of Semenivka. The raion was abolished on 18 July 2020 as part of the administrative reform of Ukraine, which reduced the number of raions of Chernihiv Oblast to five. The area of Semenivka Raion was merged into Novhorod-Siverskyi Raion. The last estimate of the raion population was 16,790 (2020 est.)

At the time of disestablishment, the raion consisted of one hromada, Semenivka urban hromada with the administration in Semenivka.
