= Chaikyne, Simferopol Raion, Crimea =

Village in Simferopol Raion, Crimea

Chaikyne
- Village
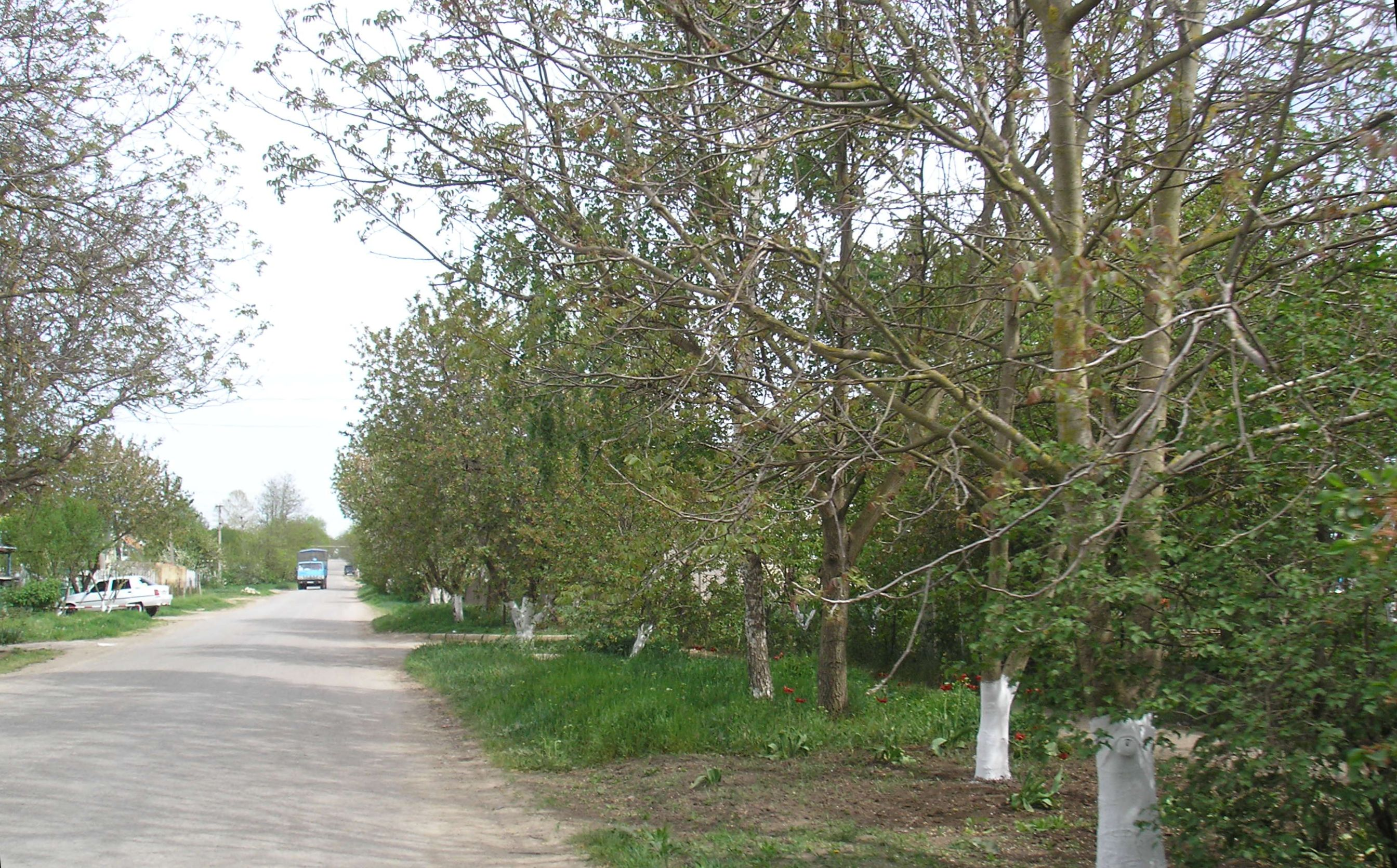

- Location within Crimea
- Coordinates: 45°05′23″N 34°04′52″E
- Country: Disputed: Ukraine (de jure); Russia (de facto)
- Region: (Autonomous Republic of Crimea) Crimea^{1}
- Municipality: Simferopol
- Elevation: 150 m (490 ft)

Population (2014)
  - Total: 1,051
- Time zone: UTC+4 (MSK)
- ^{1} Autonomous Republic of Crimea (de jure) or Republic of Crimea (de facto), depending on jurisdiction.

Chaikyne (Ukrainian: Чайкине; Russian: Чайкино; Crimean Tatar: Çüyke) is a village located in Simferopol Raion, Crimea. Population: 1,051 (2014 Census).

== See also ==
- Simferopol Raion
