= Ponornytsia settlement hromada =

Ponornytsia settlement hromada Понорницька селищна громада
- Hromada
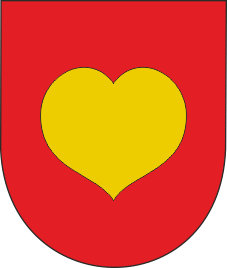
- Coat of arms
- Interactive map of Ponornytsia settlement hromada
- Country: Ukraine
- Oblast: Chernihiv
- Raion: Novhorod-Siverskyi

Area
  - Total: 517.8 km^{2} (199.9 sq mi)

Population (2020)
  - Total: 7,523
  - Density: 14.53/km^{2} (37.63/sq mi)
- CATOTTG code: UA74060050000061355
- Settlements: 17
- Rural settlements: 1
- Villages: 16
- Website: ponornycka-gromada.gov.ua

Ponornytsia settlement hromada (Ukrainian: Понорницька селищна громада) is a hromada of Ukraine, located in Novhorod-Siverskyi Raion, Chernihiv Oblast. Its administrative center is the rural settlement of Ponornytsia.

It has an area of 517.8 square kilometres (199.9 mi^{2}) and a population of 7,523, as of 2020.

== Composition ==
The hromada includes seventeen settlements: one rural settlement (Ponornytsia) and sixteen villages, namely:

- Avdiivka
- Desnianske
- Ivankiv
- Krysky
- Kurylivka
- Mezyn
- Osmaky
- Pokoshychi
- Radychiv
- Rozloty
- Rykhly
- Shaboltasivka
- Smile
- Velykyi Lis
- Verba
- Zelena Poliana

== Demographics ==
As of the 2001 Ukrainian census, the community had a population of 12,004 inhabitants. The native language composition was as follows:

Native languages (2001)
	percent
Ukrainian	98.9%
Russian	0.9%
others	0.2%

== See also ==
- List of hromadas of Ukraine
