= Novozybkovsky Uyezd =

Novozybkovsky Uyezd (Новозыбковский уезд) or Novozybkiv Povit (Ukrainian: Новозибківський повіт, romanized: Novozybkivskyi povit) was one of the subdivisions of the Chernigov Governorate of the Russian Empire. It was situated in the northern part of the governorate. Its administrative centre was Novozybkov.

The governorate was incorporated into the Ukrainian SSR, and part of it including the Novozybkovsky Uyezd was transferred to the Gomel Oblast of the Russian SFSR in 1919.

== Demographics ==
At the time of the Russian Empire Census of 1897, Novozybkovsky Uyezd had a population of 164,840. Of these, 94.2% spoke Russian, 5.4% Yiddish, 0.2% Belarusian, 0.1% Polish and 0.1% Ukrainian as their native language.
