= Mezyn National Nature Park =

National park in Ukraine

- Ukrainian: Мезинський національний природний парк
- IUCN category II (national park)
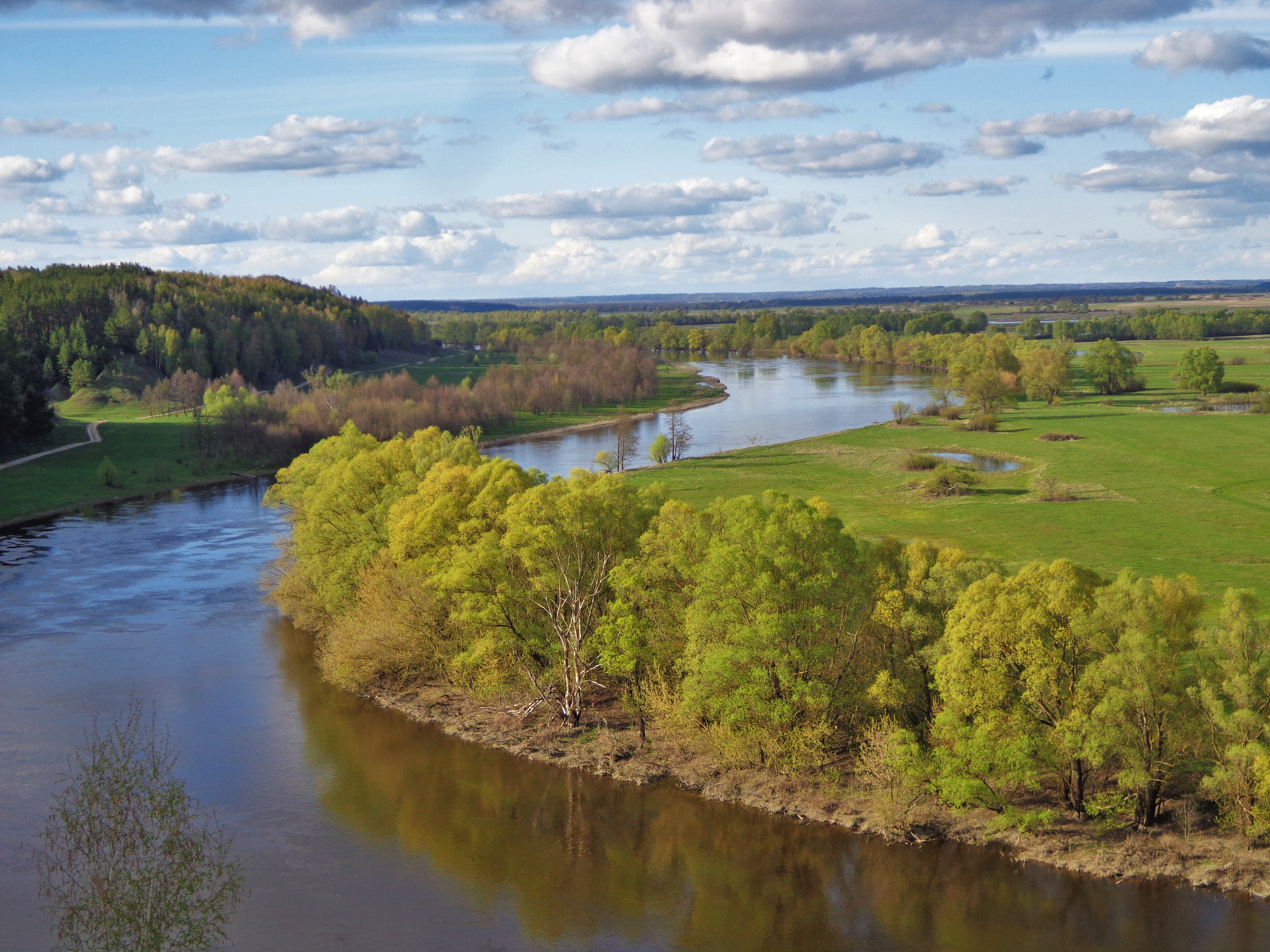
- Mezynskyi National Nature Park

- Location within Ukraine
- Location: Chernihiv Oblast
- Nearest city: Korop
- Coordinates: 51°43′09″N 32°17′12″E
- Area: 31,035 hectares (76,689 acres; 310 km^{2}; 120 sq mi)
- Established: 2004
- Governing body: Ministry of Ecology and Natural Resources (Ukraine)
- Website: http://mezinpark.com.ua/

The Mezyn National Nature Park (Ukrainian: Мезинський національний природний парк) is a national park of Ukraine that covers forest and floodplain terraces of the Desna River in the northern part of the country. The park was created to balance the protection of sensitive ecological and archaeological sites, recreation, and rural agriculture. Administratively, the park is in Novhorod-Siverskyi Raion of Chernihiv Oblast, about 150 km north of the regional city of Kharkiv.

== Topography ==
Most of the park is on the right bank of the Desna River, which runs north to south down the eastern and southern borders of the park. The terrain is glacial moraines, sloping terraces, floodplain terraces, and elevated plains with many tributary streams running down to the river. The hills range from 125 to 208 meters above sea level. The general area is part of the Dnieper River Lowlands. The park is about 20 km west-to-east, and 30 km north-to-south. It is situated about 110 km east of the regional city of Chernihiv, and 60 km downstream from the border with Russia to the north.

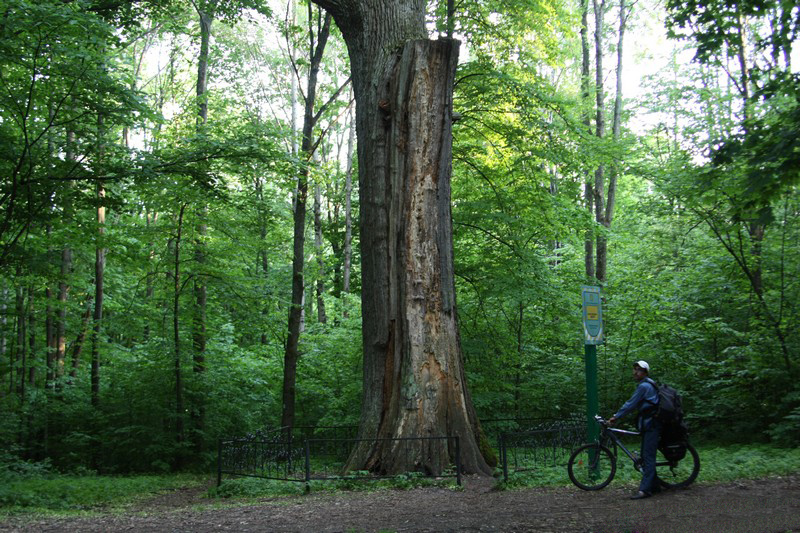
400 year-old oak tree in Mezyn National Park

== Climate and ecoregion ==
The climate of Mezyn NP is Humid continental climate, warm summer (Köppen climate classification (Dfb)). This climate is characterized by large seasonal temperature differentials and a warm summer (at least four months averaging over 10 °C (50 °F), but no month averaging over 22 °C (72 °F). Precipitation in the Mezyn general region averages 590–640 mm/yr. The average temperature in January is −7.9 °C (17.8 °F), and in August is 19.4 °C (66.9 °F). There is snow cover for 110–115 days on average, with depth averaging 21–22 cm.

Mezyn is located in the East European forest steppe ecoregion, a transition zone between the broadleaf forests of the north and the grasslands to the south. This ecoregion is characterized by a mosaic of forests, steppe, and riverine wetlands.

== Flora and fauna ==
Forest covers 38% of the park, steppe and grasslands cover 16%, rural agriculture covers 35% (with several small villages in the park), 3% is lakes, 1% is bog-land, and 7% is of other cover. The forest types are Lime-oak and maple-lime-oak. There are 625 species of higher plants that have been recorded in the park. 224 species of birds, and 48 species of mammals have been recorded.

== Public use ==
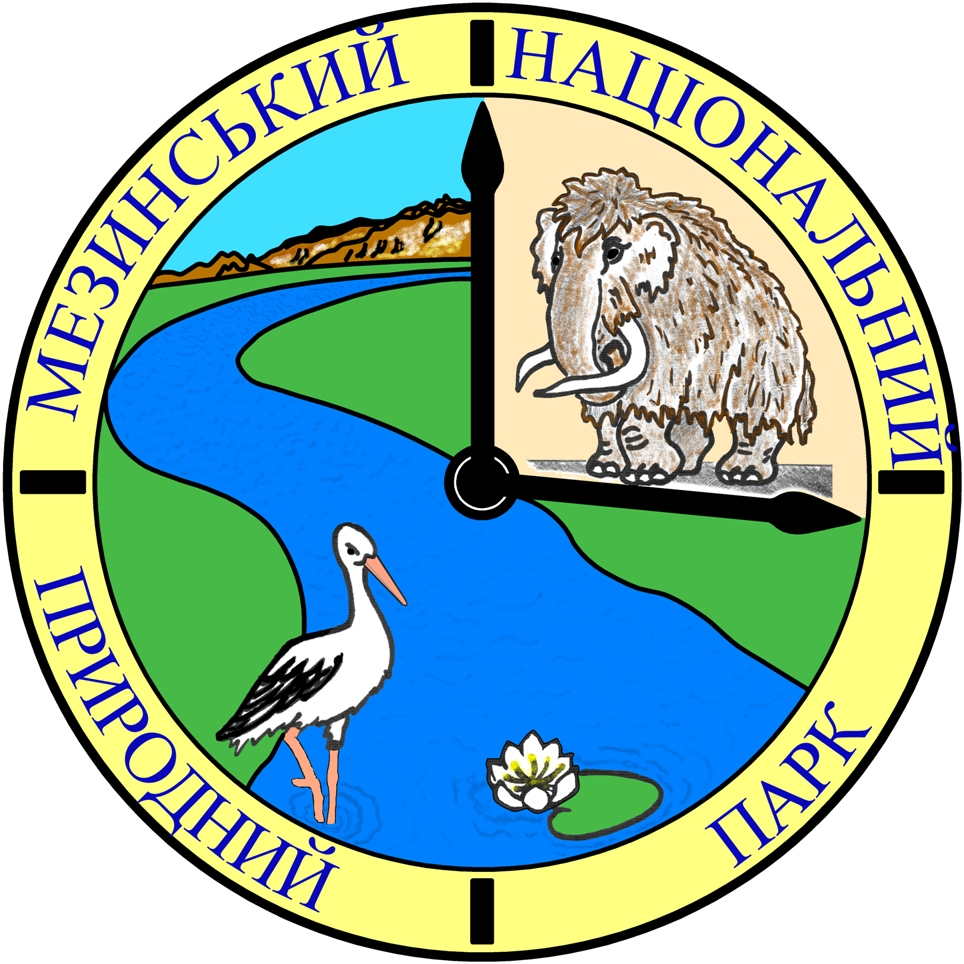
Park logo

The park features three museums, which can be visited for a small fee:

- Mezinsky Archeological Research Museum
- Visitor Center and Museum of Mezyn National Nature Park
- The Center for Preserving Antiquities, a room of ethnography and history of Mezyn

There are a number of hiking trails and campsites. Visitors can stay in fixed lodging on site, parking is available. Campers can rent tents, sleeping bags, coats, and backpacks.

== See also ==
- National Parks of Ukraine
