= Novhorod-Siverskyi Raion =

Subdivision of Chernihiv Oblast, Ukraine

Novhorod-Siverskyi Raion Новгород-Сіверський район
- Raion
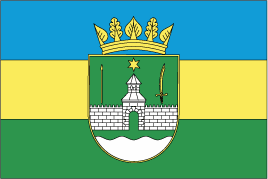
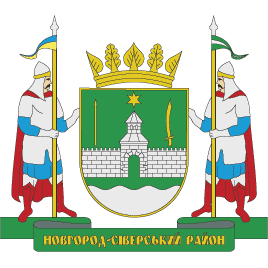
- Flag Coat of arms

- Raion location in Chernihiv Oblast
- Interactive map of Novhorod-Siverskyi Raion
- Coordinates: 52°4′38″N 33°6′58″E
- Country: Ukraine
- Oblast: Chernihiv Oblast
- Admin. center: Novhorod-Siverskyi
- Subdivisions: 4 hromadas

Area
  - Total: 1,804 km^{2} (697 sq mi)

Population (2022)
  - Total: 62,141
  - Density: 34.45/km^{2} (89.22/sq mi)
- Time zone: UTC+2 (EET)
  - Summer (DST): UTC+3 (EEST)

Novhorod-Siverskyi Raion (Ukrainian: Новгород-Сіверський район) is a raion (district) of Chernihiv Oblast, northern Ukraine. Its administrative centre is located at Novhorod-Siverskyi. Population: 62,141 (2022 estimate).

On 18 July 2020, as part of the administrative reform of Ukraine, the number of raions of Chernihiv Oblast was reduced to five, and the area of Novhorod-Siverskyi Raion was significantly expanded. Two abolished raions, Korop and Semenivka Raions, as well as the city of Novhorod-Siverskyi, which was previously incorporated as a city of oblast significance and did not belong to the raion, were merged into Novhorod-Siverskyi Raion. The January 2020 estimate of the raion population was 12,340 (2020 est.).

== Subdivisions ==
=== Current ===
After the reform in July 2020, the raion consisted of 4 hromadas:

- Korop settlement hromada with the administration in the rural settlement of Korop, transferred from Korop Raion;
- Novhorod-Siverskyi urban hromada with the administration in the city of Novhorod-Siverskyi, retained from Novhorod-Siverskyi Raion and Novhorod-Siverskyi Municipality.
- Ponornytsia settlement hromada with the administration in the rural settlement of Ponornytsia, transferred from Korop Raion;
- Semenivka urban hromada with the administration in the city of Semenivka, transferred from Semenivka Raion.

=== Before 2020 ===
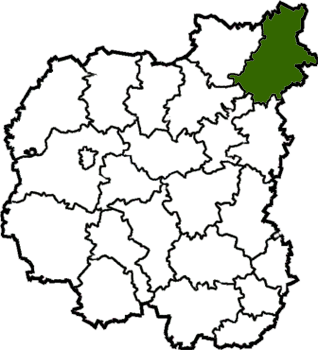
Novhorod-Siverskyi Raion in Chernihiv Oblast before 2020

At the time of disestablishment, the raion consisted of one hromada, Novhorod-Siverskyi urban hromada with the administration in Novhorod-Siverskyi. The hromada also included Novhorod-Siverskyi Municipality.
