= Highway M04 (Ukraine) =

Highway in Ukraine

Highway M04
- Автошлях М04
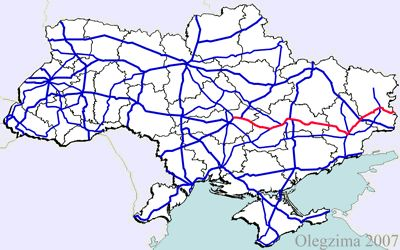

Route information
- Part of E40 E50
- History: Merged with the M12 to form the M30

Major junctions
- West end: M 12 in Znamianka
- M 22 in Oleksandriia; M 03 in Debaltseve
- East end: Russian border at Izvaryne

Location
- Country: Ukraine
- Oblasts: Kirovohrad, Dnipropetrovsk, Donetsk, Luhansk

Highway system
- Roads in Ukraine; State Highways

Highway M04 was a Ukrainian international highway connecting Znamianka to Sorokyne on the border with Russia, where it continued into Russia as the A260.

During the Soviet Union, the M04 was part of the M21. The highway stretched through four oblasts and ended at the Izvaryne-Donetsk border checkpoint. The section from Znamianka to Debaltseve was part of European route E50, and the section from Debaltseve to the Russian border was part of European route E40. On 28 April, 2021, the M04 was decommissioned and merged with the M12 to form the new M30.

== Russo-Ukrainian War ==
In eastern Ukraine, significant armed conflict has occurred along and near the M04 in the Donetsk and Luhansk Oblasts during the war in Donbas, later evolving into the Russian invasion of Ukraine.

== Route ==
Marker	Main settlements	Notes	Highway Interchanges
0 km	Znamianka		E50/ E584 M 12 • H 01
	Oleksandriia		E584 M 22
	Chapaivka		H 11
	Dnipro		H 08
	Donetsk		H 20
	Debaltseve		E40/ E50 M 03
	Luhansk		H 21
566 km	Izvaryne / Border (Russia)		E40 A 260 (Russia)

== Gallery ==
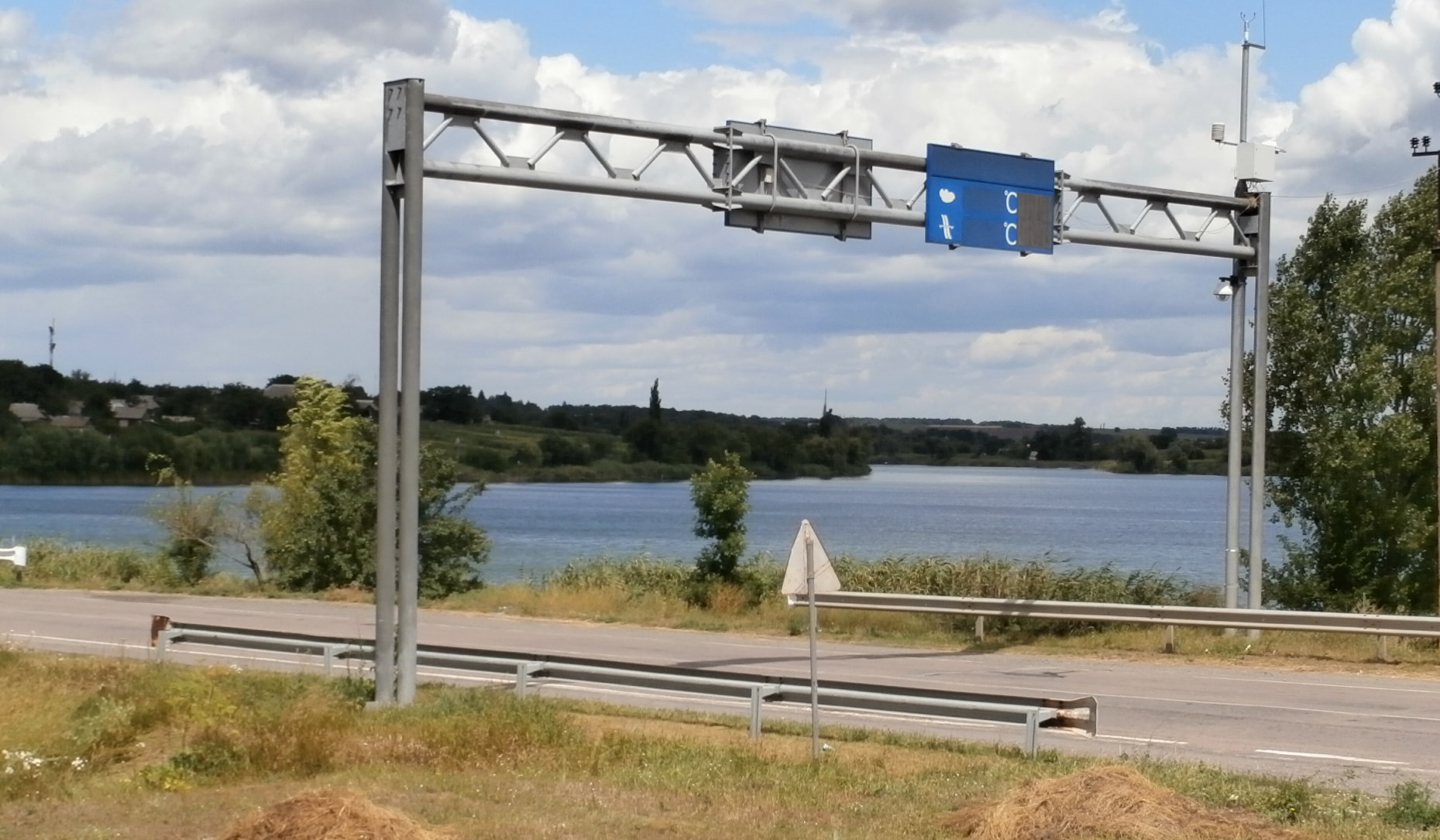
M04 crossing Zhovta River near Piatykhatky, Dnipropetrovsk Oblast

== See also ==
- Roads in Ukraine
- Ukraine Highways
- International E-road network
- Pan-European corridors
