= Highway M05 (Ukraine) =

Highway in Ukraine

Highway M05
- Автошлях М05
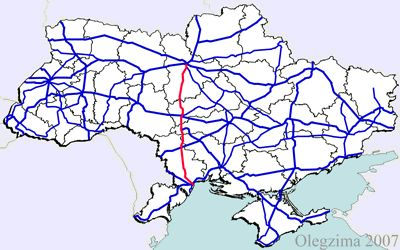

Route information
- Part of E95
- Length: 453.3 km (281.7 mi) With additional roads: 478.0 km (297.0 mi)

Major junctions
- North end: M 01/ M 07/ M 03/ M 06/ H 01/ H 07 in Kyiv
- M 12/ H 16 in Uman; M 13 in Liubashivka
- South end: Odesa

Location
- Country: Ukraine
- Oblasts: Kyiv, Cherkasy, Kirovohrad, Mykolaiv, Odesa

Highway system
- Roads in Ukraine; State Highways

Highway M05 is a state international highway in Ukraine connecting the two largest cities: Kyiv and Odesa.

Together with the M01 it is a part of European route E95 (Saint Petersburg – Kyiv – Odesa … Samsun – Merzifon) and the Trans-European transportation corridor IX. The route is 453 km (281 mi) long. It starts in Kyiv, goes through Vasylkiv, Bila Tserkva, Uman, Liubashivka and ends in Odesa.

The road is a 2x2-lane dual carriageway in its entirety.

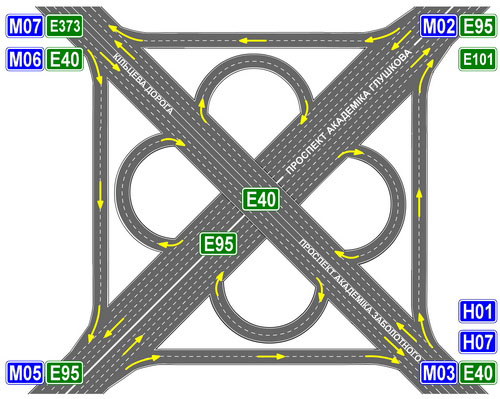
Highway junction E95 — E40 in Kyiv.

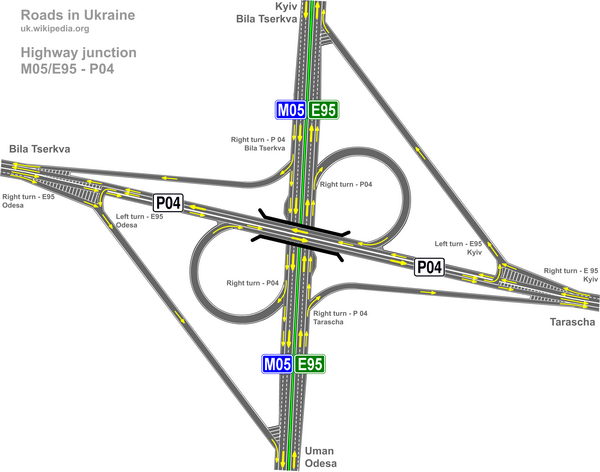
Highway junction M 05 E95 — P04 near Bila Tserkva.

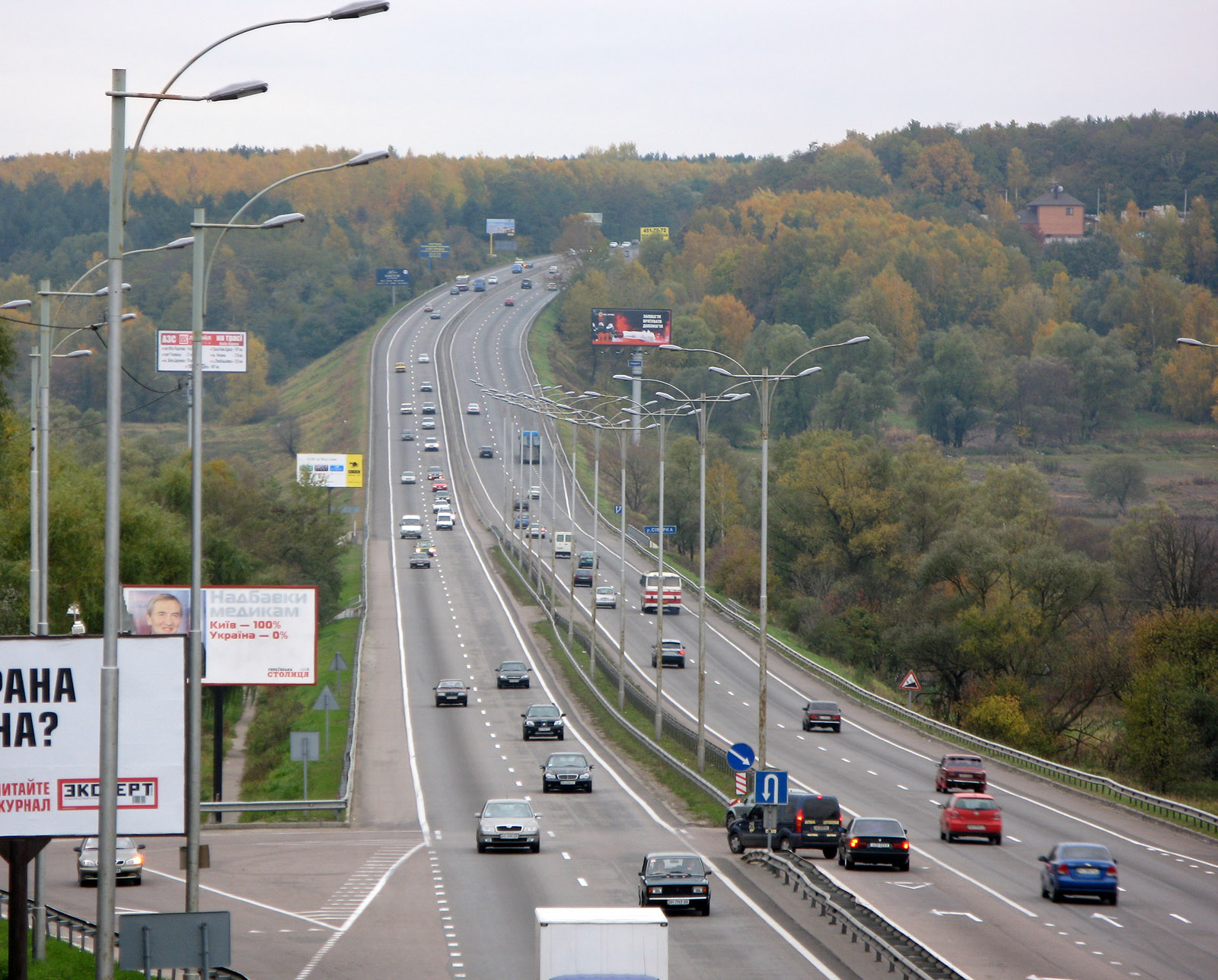
Section of the M05 near Kyiv.

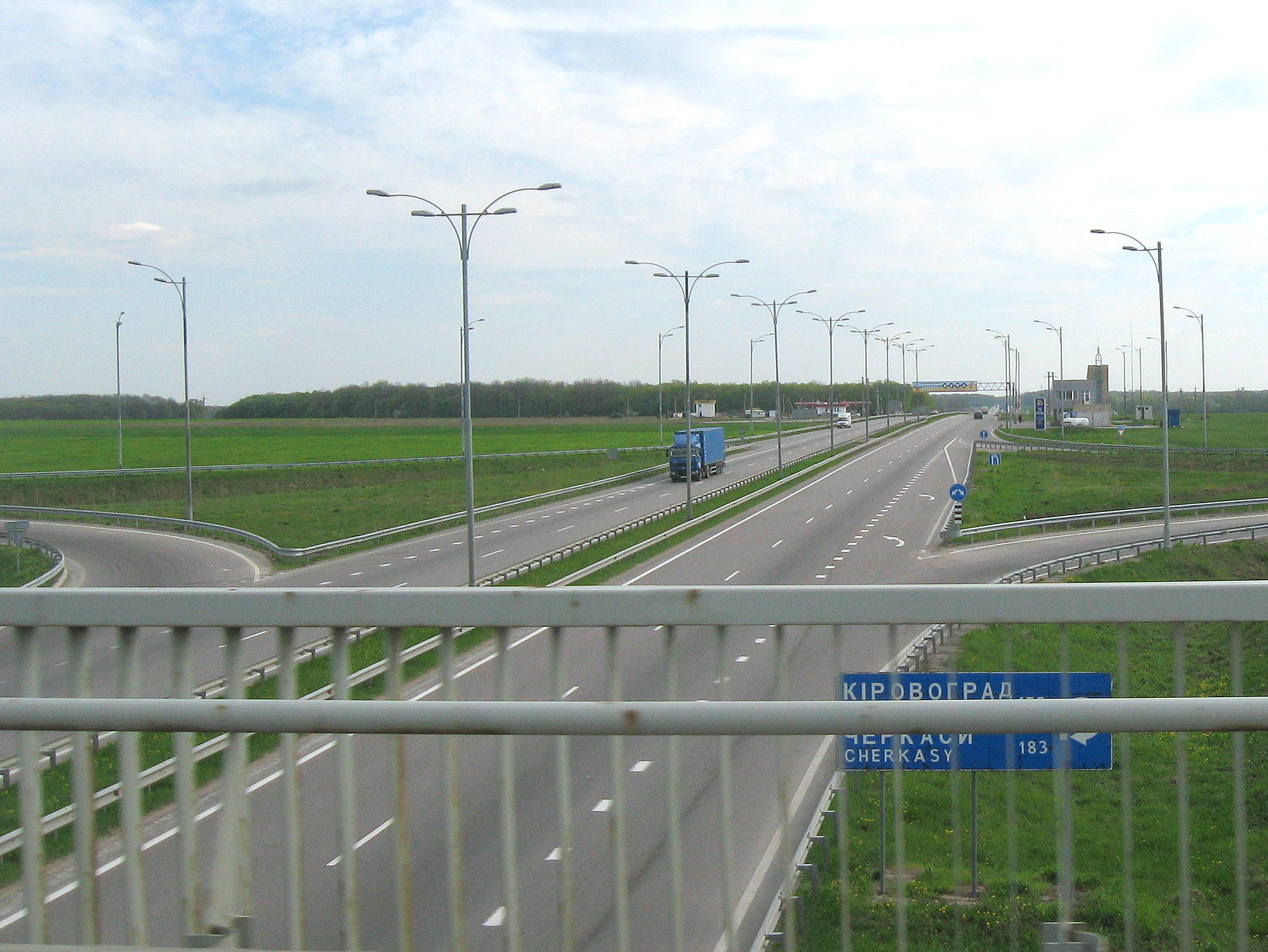
M05 near Uman, Cherkasy oblast

== Main route ==
Highway M05
| Marker | Main settlements | Notes | Highway Interchanges |
| 0 km/0 mi | Kyiv | | E95/E101 M 01 • E373 M 07 • E40( M 03 - M 06) • H 01 • H 07 |
| 26 km/16 mi | Vasylkiv | Bypass | |
| 44 km/27 mi | Mytnytsia | Interchange | |
| 55 km/34 mi | Ksaverivka | | |
| 65 km/40 mi | Hrebinky | | |
| 78 km/48.5 mi | Bila Tserkva | Bypass 16 km (9.9 mi) | P 04 |
| | Uman | | E50 M 12 • H 16 |
| 308 km/191 mi | Liubashivka | | E584 M 13 |
| 453 km/281.5 mi | Odesa | | |

== See also ==
- Roads in Ukraine
- Ukraine Highways
- International E-road network
- Pan-European corridors
