= Highway M21 (Ukraine) =

Highway in Ukraine

Highway M21
- Автошлях М21
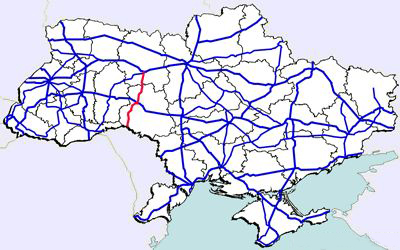

Route information
- Part of E583
- Length: 401.7 km (249.6 mi)

Major junctions
- North end: Belarusian border at Vistusovichi checkpoint
- M 06 / H 03 in Zhytomyr; M 12 in Vinnytsia
- South end: Moldovan border at Mohyliv-Podilskyi (thru Otaci) (Moldova)

Location
- Country: Ukraine
- Oblasts: Zhytomyr, Vinnytsia

Highway system
- Roads in Ukraine; State Highways
← M 20	→ M 22

M21 is a Ukrainian international highway (M-highway) which connects Zhytomyr and Vinnytsia to the border with Moldova. The highway also connects two major transnational corridors, Pan-European Corridor IX and the transportation corridor "Europe-Asia". The entire route is part of European route E583. The section from Zhytomyr to the Belarusian border was previously P28.

== Route ==
Marker	Main settlements	Notes	Highway Interchanges
0 km	Zhytomyr		M 06 • H 03
	Vinnytsia		M 12
220 km	Mohyliv-Podilskyi / Border (Moldova)		Border checkpoint

== See also ==
- Roads in Ukraine
- Ukraine Highways
- International E-road network
- Pan-European corridors
