= Highway H16 (Ukraine) =

Highway in Cherkasy Oblast, Ukraine

Highway H16
- Автошлях Н16
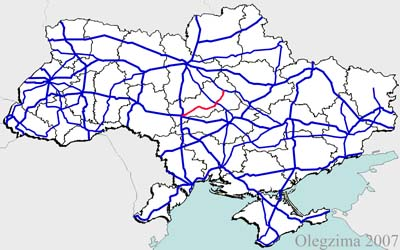

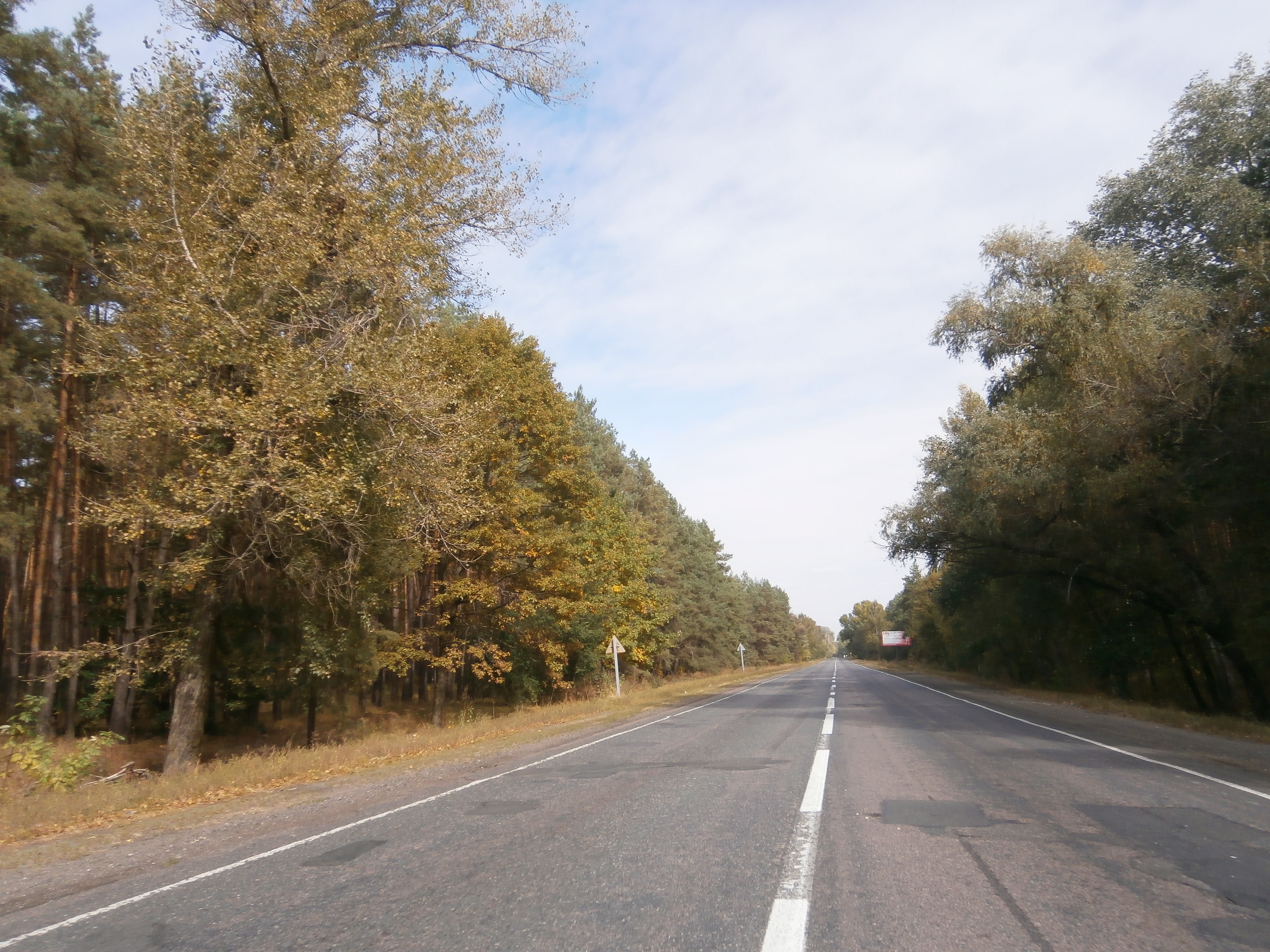
- H16 in Zolotonosha Raion

Route information
- Length: 217 km (135 mi)

Major junctions
- East end: H 08 in Zolotonosha
- West end: M 12 in Uman

Location
- Country: Ukraine
- Oblasts: Cherkasy

Highway system
- Roads in Ukraine; State Highways
← H 15	→ H 17

H16 is a national road (H-Highway) in Cherkasy Oblast, Ukraine.

It starts at the roundabout in H08, at the beginning of the Zolotonosha bypass road, on the outskirts of the village of Zhar, goes south to the Kremenchuk Reservoir, crosses it with the Cherkasy Dam. Then it passes through the cities of Cherkasy, Smila, Shpola, Zvenyhorodka, Talne and ends at the roundabout with the M12 near Uman.

The total length of H16 is listed by the State Agency of Automobile Roads of Ukraine at 217 km (135 mi).

== See also ==
- Roads in Ukraine
