= Highway M12 (Ukraine) =

Former highway in Ukraine

Highway M12
- Автошлях М12
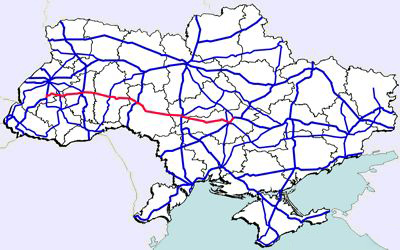

Route information
- Part of E50 E584
- History: Merged with the M04 to form the M30

Major junctions
- West end: M 06 / H 10 in Stryi
- M 19 / H 02 in Ternopil; M 21 near Vinnytsia; M 05 / H 16 in Uman; M 13 / H 14 / H 23 in Kropyvnytskyi
- East end: M 04 in Znamianka

Location
- Country: Ukraine
- Oblasts: Lviv, Ternopil, Khmelnytskyi, Vinnytsia, Cherkasy, Kirovohrad

Highway system
- Roads in Ukraine; State Highways
| ← M 11 | → M 13 |

M12 was a Ukrainian international highway (M-highway) connecting Lviv Oblast to Central Ukraine, where after crossing the Dnieper it continued further as the M04. On 28 April 2021, the M12 was decommissioned and merged with the M04 to form the new M30.

== General overview ==
The M12 is a major transnational corridor and along with the M04 combines into E50. The highway is also part of the Gdańsk - Odesa Transportation corridor on the segment from Ternopil to Uman. It is one of the longest routes spanning nearly 800 km (500 mi).

=== Description ===
For the entire route from Stryi to Znamianka the M12 is part of the E50, however in Kropyvnytskyi it is also joined by the E584 that travels from Moldova to Poltava.

== Main Route ==
Main route and connections to/intersections with other highways in Ukraine.

Highway M12
| Marker | Main settlements | Notes | Highway Interchanges |
| 0 km | Stryi | | E50/ E471 M 06 • H 10 |
| | Rohatyn | | H 09 |
| | Ternopil | Bypass | E85 M 19 • H 02 |
| | Khmelnytskyi | Bypass | H 03 |
| | Vinnytsia | Bypass | E583 M 21 |
| | Uman | | E85 M 05 • H 16 |
| | Kropyvnytskyi | | E584 M 13 • H 14 • H 23 |
| 746 km | Znamianka | | E50/ E584 M 04 • H 01 |

== Access routes ==
The highway passes the following cities going around them, however it has spurred away access routes towards them.

- Vinnytsia 1.4 km (0.87 mi)
- Khmelnytskyi 8 km (5.0 mi)

== Gallery ==
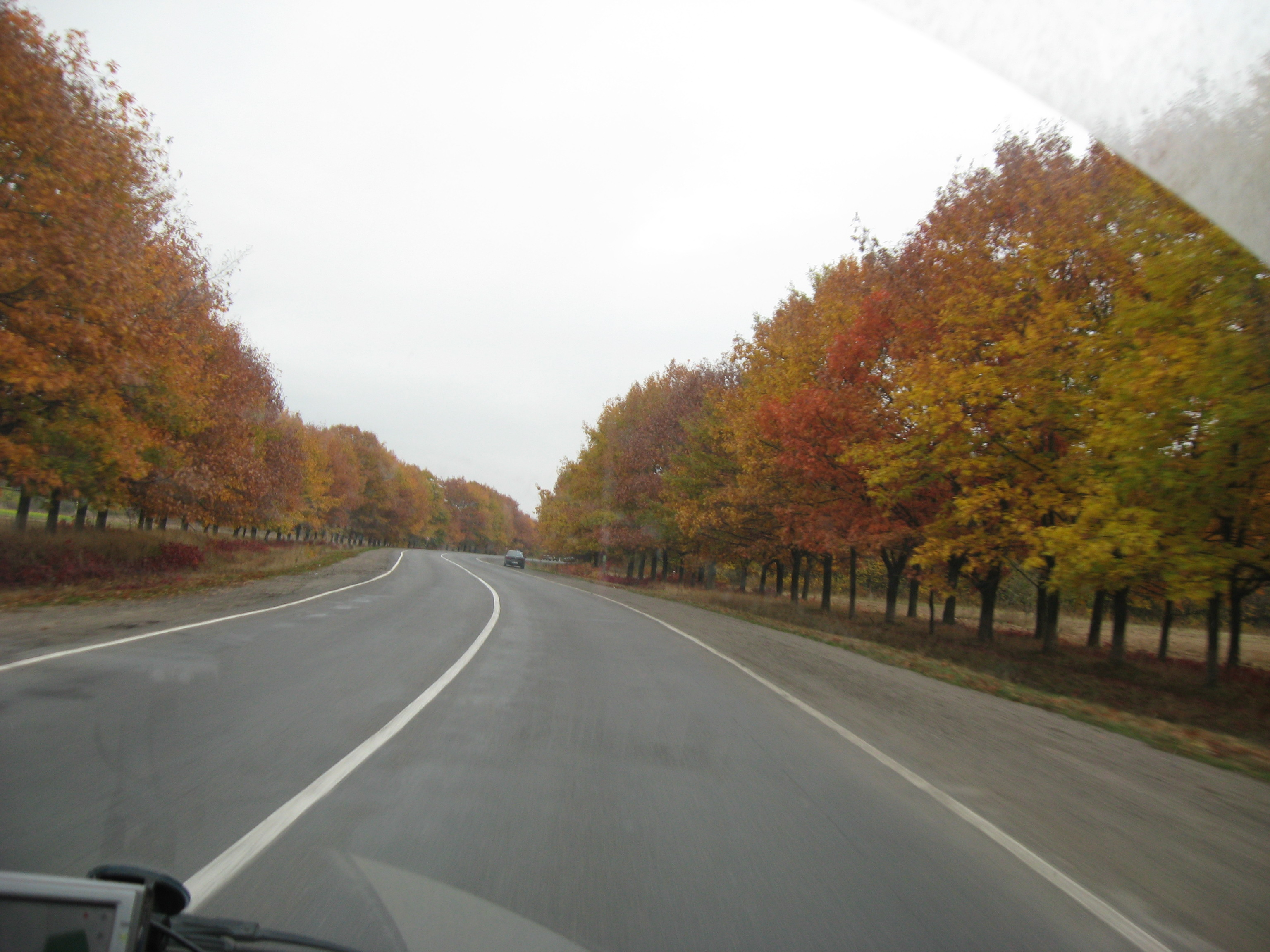
M12 in Vinnytsia oblast

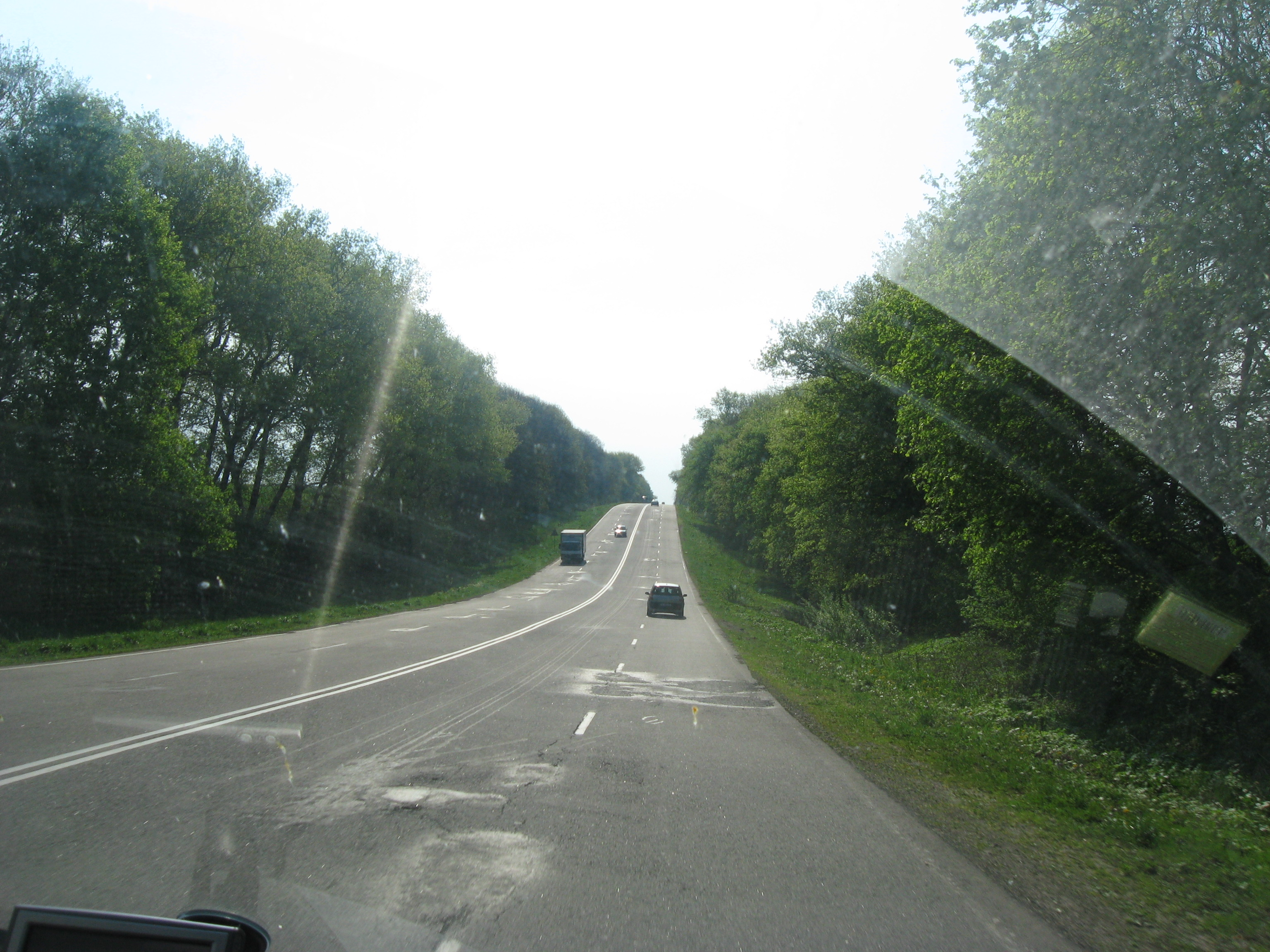
M12 in Ternopil Oblast

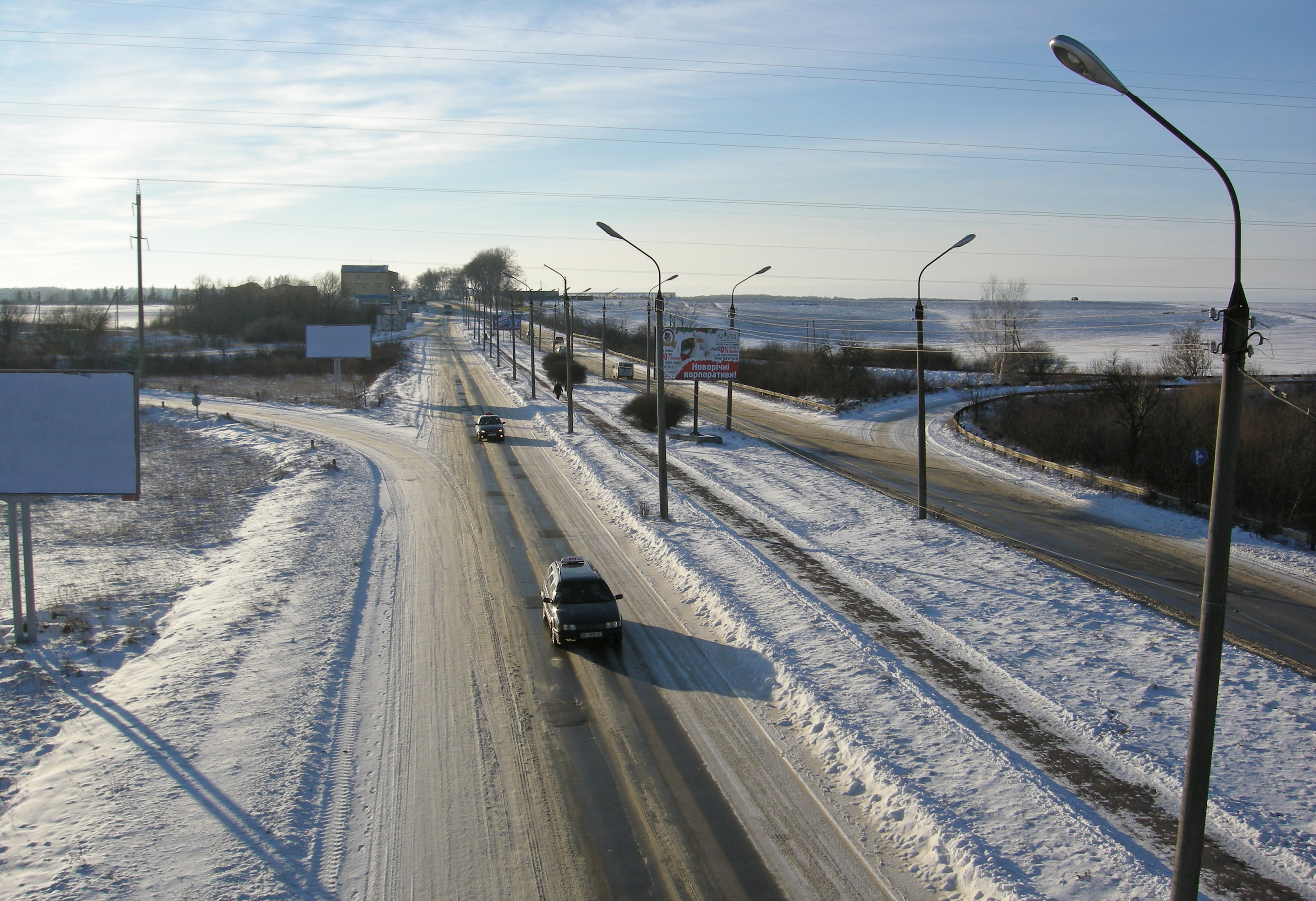
M12 highway near Ternopil

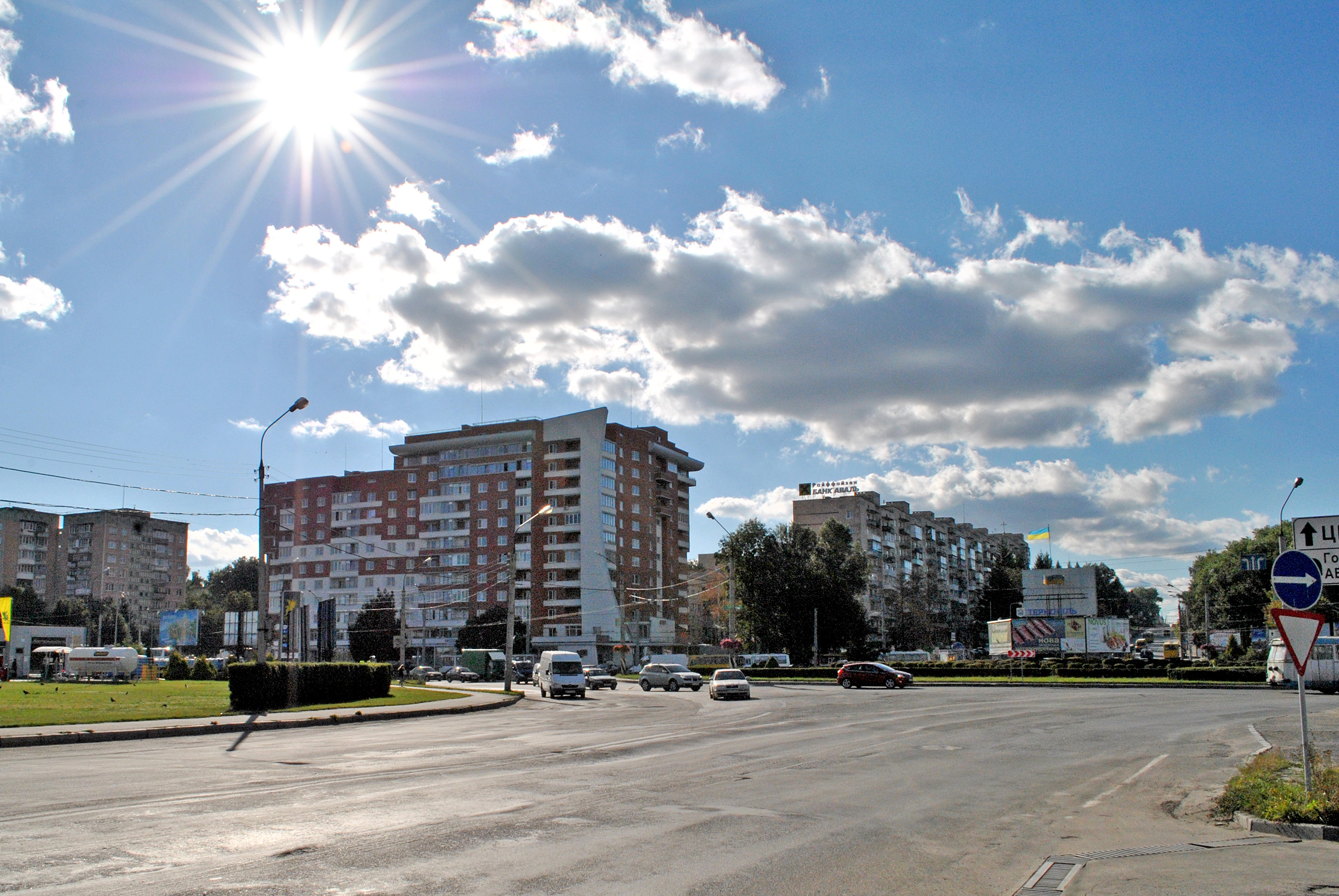
M12 junction in Ternopil

== See also ==
- Roads in Ukraine
- Ukraine Highways
- International E-road network
- Pan-European corridors
