= Highway M22 (Ukraine) =

Highway in Ukraine

Highway M22
- Автошлях М22
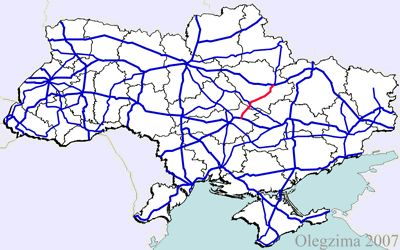

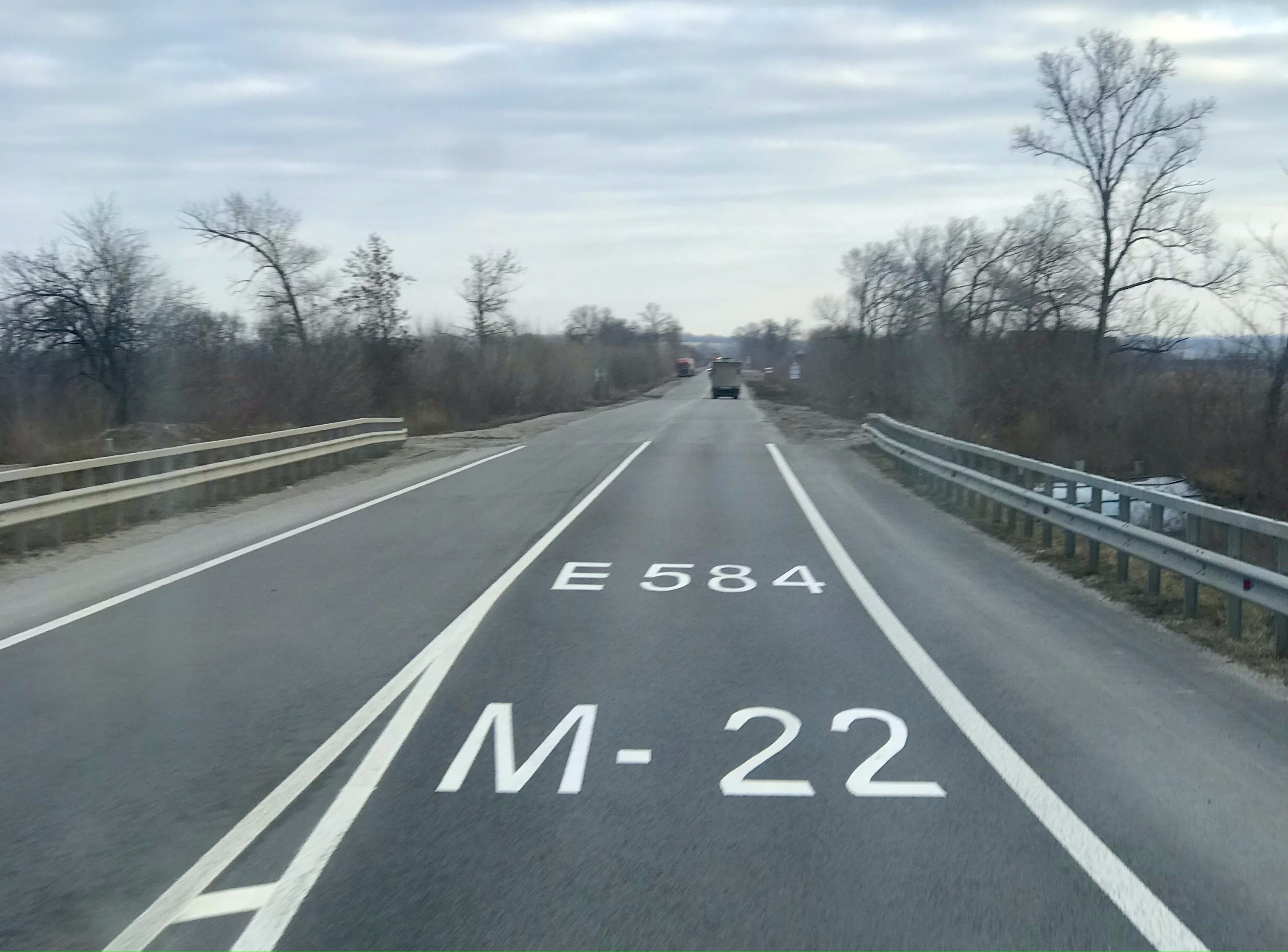

Route information
- Part of E584
- Length: 186.5 km (115.9 mi)

Major junctions
- West end: M 30 in Oleksandriia
- East end: M 03 / H 12 in Poltava

Location
- Country: Ukraine
- Oblasts: Kirovohrad, Poltava

Highway system
- Roads in Ukraine; State Highways
← M 21	→ M 23

Highway M22 is a Ukrainian international highway (M-highway) which connects Oleksandriia, Kremenchuk, and Poltava across Dnieper river. The highway also connects two major transnational corridors that run along European route E50 and European route E40. Along with the M13, the M22 composes the Ukrainian portion of European route E584 that also runs from Kropyvnytskyi to the Moldovan border onto Chișinău.

== Route ==
Marker	Main settlements	Notes	Highway Interchanges
0 km	Oleksandriia		M 30
	Kremenchuk		H 08
186 km	Poltava		M 03 • H 12

== See also ==
- Roads in Ukraine
- Ukraine Highways
- International E-road network
- Pan-European corridors
