= Highway H02 (Ukraine) =

Highway in Ukraine

Highway H02
- Автошлях Н02

Route information
- Length: 590 km (370 mi)

Major junctions
- west end: Radyvyliv
- east end: H 08 in Sofiivka

Location
- Country: Ukraine
- Oblasts: Ternopil, Kyiv

Highway system
- Roads in Ukraine; State Highways
← H 01	→ H 03

H02 is a regional road (H-Highway) in Kyiv Oblast and Ternopil Oblast, Ukraine. It runs west-east and connects Radyvyliv with Sofiivka. The section from Kremenets to Rzhyshchiv was previously a portion of P32.

== Main route ==
Main route and connections to/intersections with other highways in Ukraine.

== Gallery ==
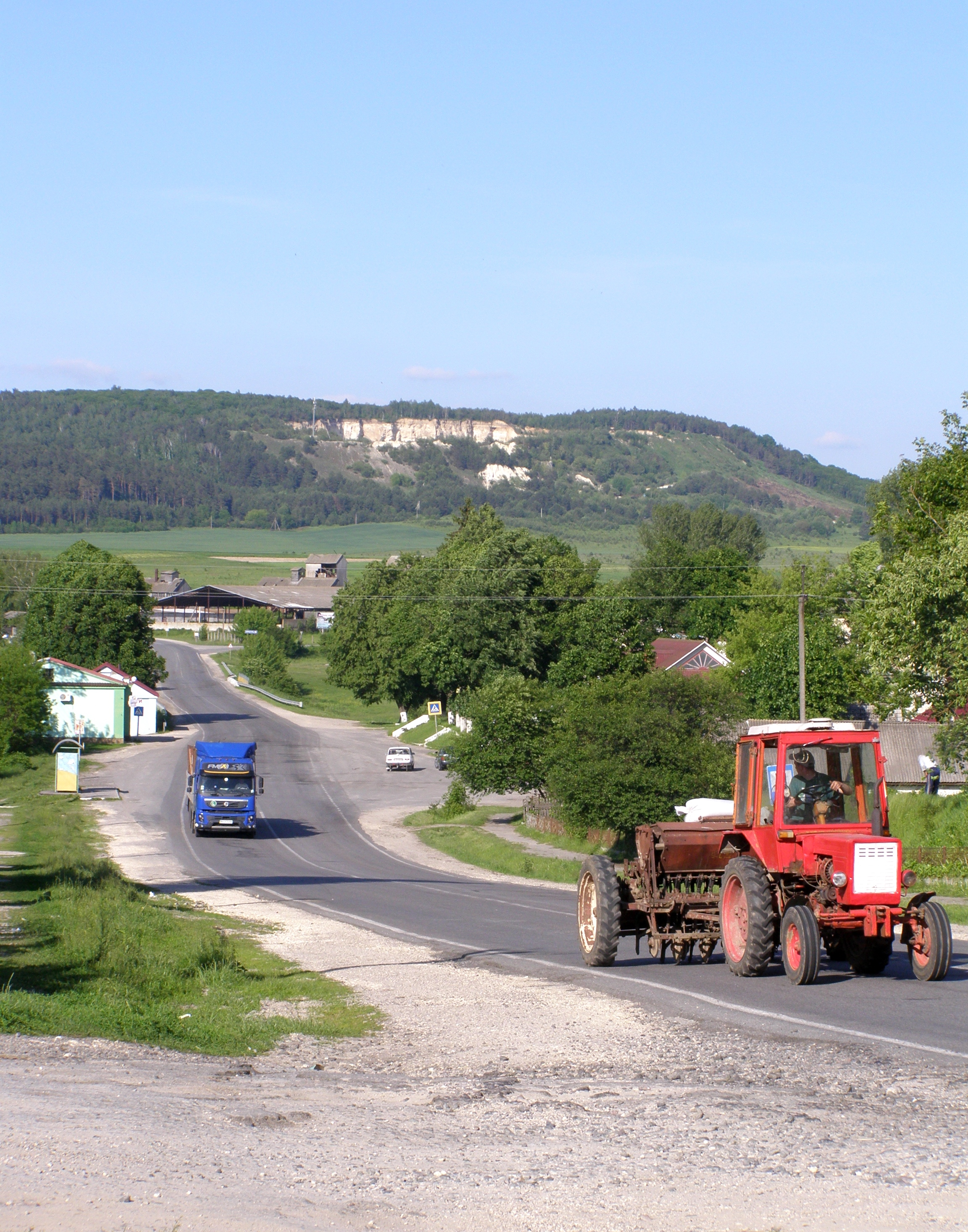
View of the highway near Kremenets

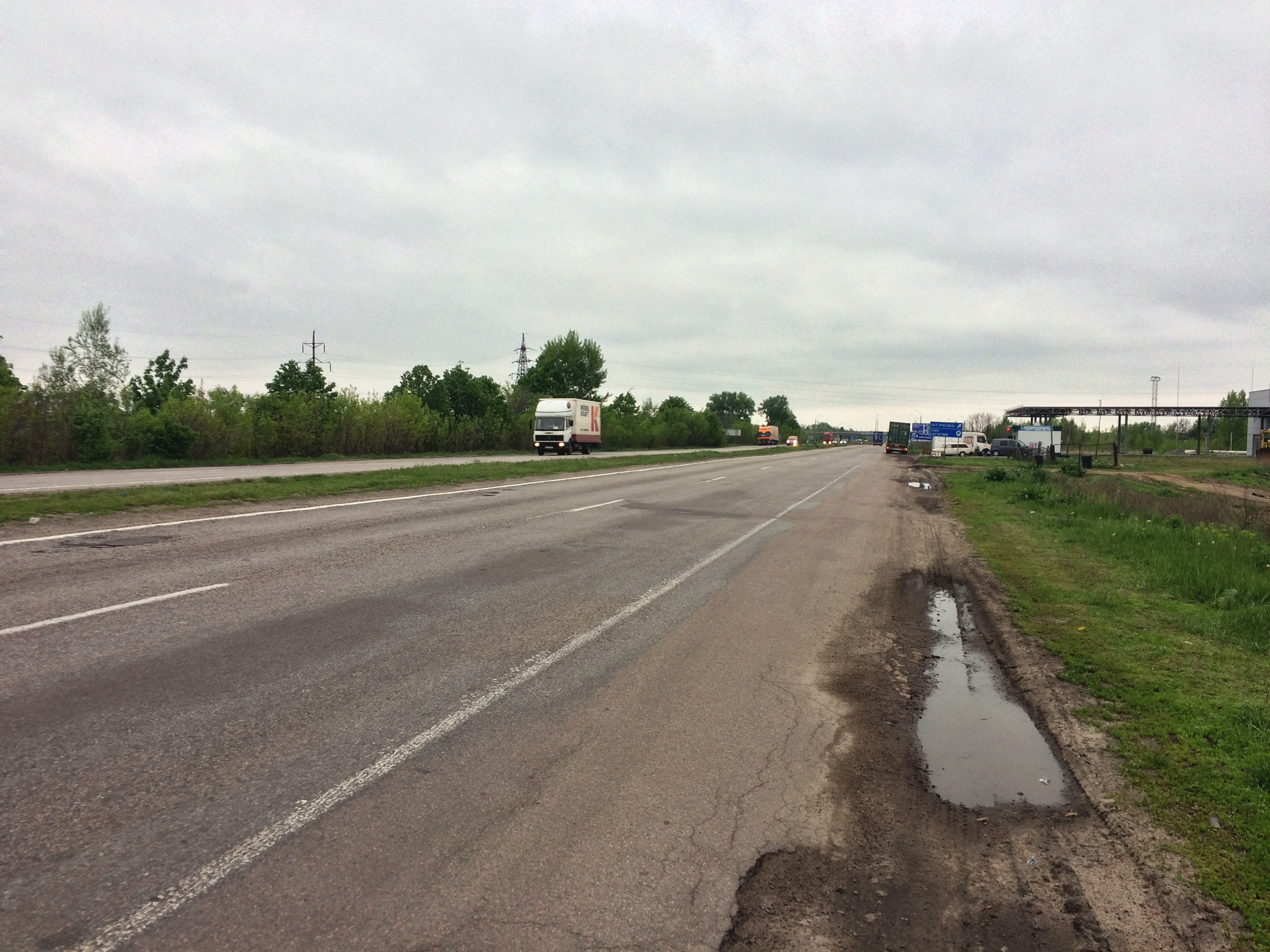
H02 road in Bila Tserkva

== See also ==
- Roads in Ukraine
