= Highway M26 (Ukraine) =

Highway in Ukraine

Highway M26
- Автошлях М26

Route information
- Part of E58 E81
- Length: 20.7 km (12.9 mi)
- Existed: 2013–present

Major junctions
- West end: M 23 near Vylok
- East end: Romanian border near Dyakov

Location
- Country: Ukraine
- Oblasts: Zakarpattia (Berehove Raion)

Highway system
- Roads in Ukraine; State Highways
← M 25	→ M 27

M26 is a Ukrainian international highway (M-highway) in western Ukraine that runs within Berehove Raion from the M23 at Vylok near the Hungarian border to the Romanian border where it continues as the DN1C into Romania. The M26 is part of European routes E81 and E58. Before 2013, the route was designated as P55.

== Main route ==
Main route and connections to/intersections with other highways in Ukraine.

Marker	Main settlements	Notes	Highway Interchanges
0 km	Vylok		M 23
20.7 km	Nevetlenfolu ( (Romania) border)		DN1C

== See also ==
- Roads in Ukraine
- Ukraine Highways
- International E-road network
- Pan-European corridors
