= Highway H01 (Ukraine) =

Highway in Ukraine

Highway H01
- Автошлях Н01
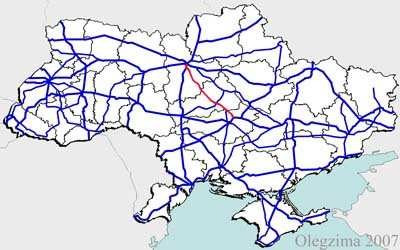

Route information
- Length: 274.7 km (170.7 mi)

Major junctions
- North end: M 03 in Kyiv
- South end: M 12 in Znamianka

Location
- Country: Ukraine
- Oblasts: Kyiv (city), Kyiv, Cherkasy, Kirovohrad

Highway system
- Roads in Ukraine; State Highways
→ H 02

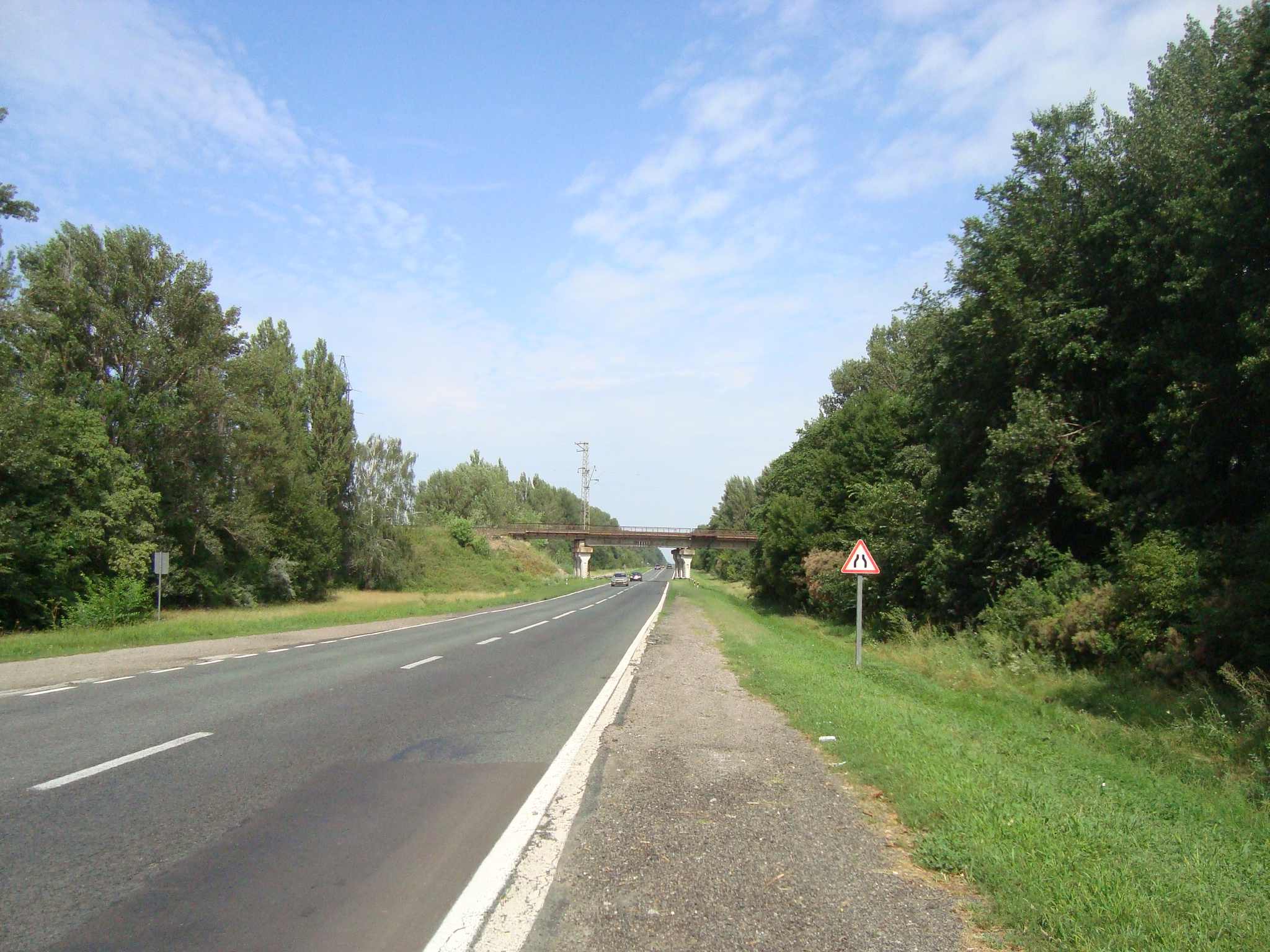
H01 road in Kyiv region

Highway H01 is a Ukrainian national highway (H-highway) connecting the capital of Ukraine Kyiv with the central regions. It runs through Kyiv, Kyiv Oblast, Cherkasy Oblast, and ends in Kirovohrad Oblast.

== Main route ==
Main route and connections to/intersections with other highways in Ukraine.

Marker	Main settlements	Notes	Highway Interchanges
0 km	Kyiv		E40 M 03 • P01
	Obukhiv		P01 • P19
	Kaharlyk		P32
	Myronivka		P09
	Smila		H 16
	Nova Osota in Kropyvnytskyi Raion		H 14
274.7 km	Znamianka Druha		E584/ E50 M 12

== Pedestrian traffic ==
In 2020, a pedestrian bridge over the highway H01 was built in Obukhiv (Kyiv Oblast).

== See also ==
- Roads in Ukraine
- Ukraine Highways
- International E-road network
- Pan-European corridors
