= Road signs in Ukraine =

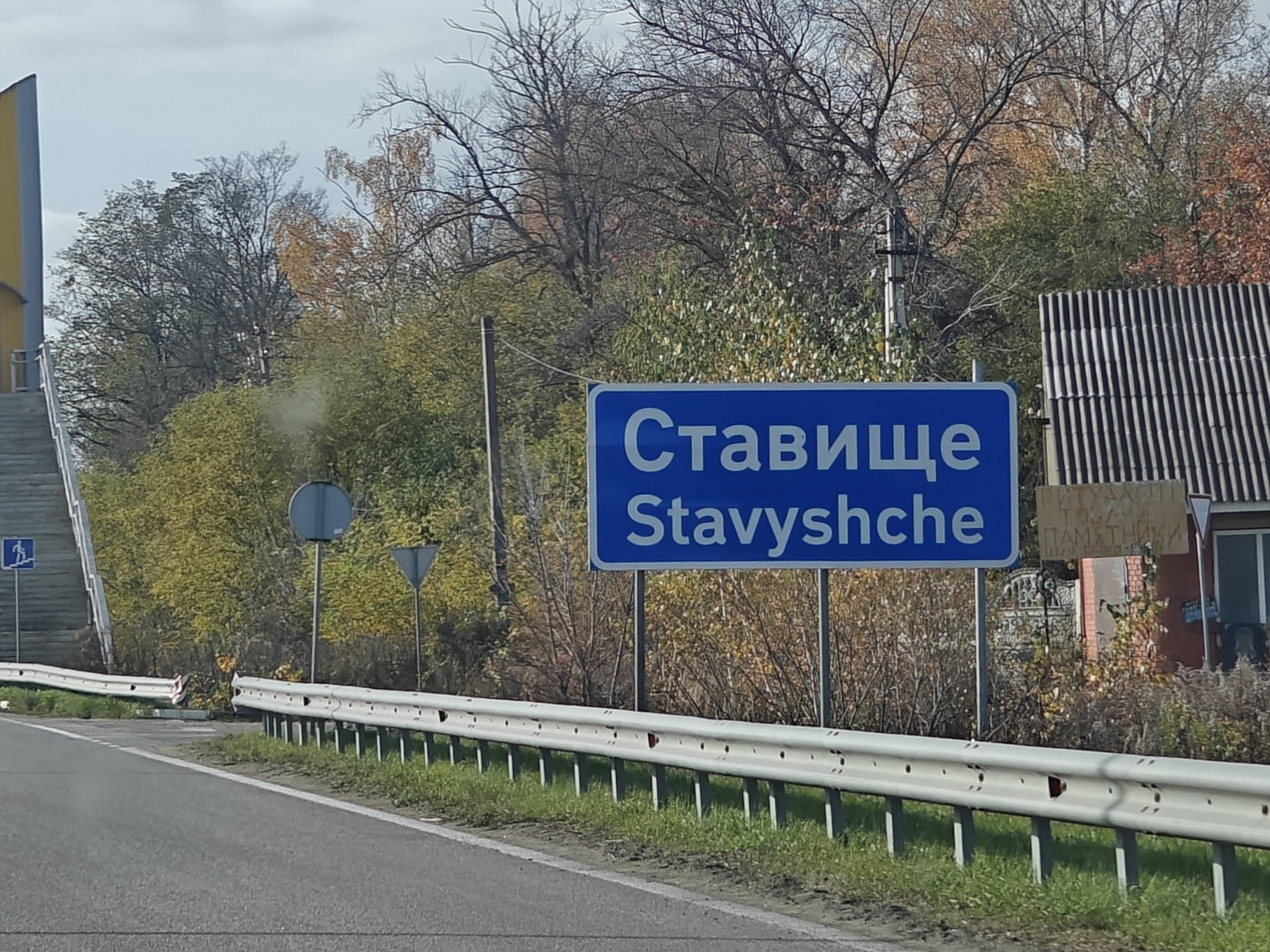
Road sign at the entrance to the village Stavyshche

Road signs in Ukraine are governed by a combination of standards set out by the Vienna Convention on Road Signs and Signals, the European Union, and Ukraine Transport and Roads Agency. Ukrainian signs are similar to the signs of other post-Soviet states and are set out in 7 separate categories based on meaning: warning, priority, prohibitory, mandatory, information, service, and additional plates.

The state importance roads have different indexes, each standing for the respective letter in Cyrillic.

Ukrainian road signs were used in the Autonomous Republic of Crimea and Sevastopol before their occupation and subsequent annexation by Russia in 2014. After the annexation of the Crimean peninsula by Russia, Ukrainian road signs began to be removed and replaced with Russian ones. In some cases, road signs in Ukrainian were removed from Crimea, while in others the text was changed from Ukrainian to Russian, including the names of settlements.

After the Russian invasion of Ukraine was started on February 24, 2022, Ukravtodor began to remove road signs as they could be used by invading Russian forces to find their way around the country. Ukravtodor also posted an edited photo of a standard road sign in which directions to nearby cities have been replaced with Russian-language profanities. In the territories of the Kherson and Zaporizhzhia Oblasts occupied by Russia in 2022, Ukrainian-language road signs were removed by the Russians and replaced with Russian-language ones.

== Standardisation ==
On January 1, 1980, the standard GOST 10807-78 was introduced in the Soviet Union. In August 1991, after Ukraine gained independence from the Soviet Union, the standard GOST 10807-78 continued to operate until it was replaced by the Ukrainian standard DSTU 2586-94 in 1995. With the adoption of the standard DSTU 2586-94 new road signs appeared in addition to those used in the Soviet Union before its collapse in 1991.

On January 1, 2003 the standard DSTU 4100-2002 was introduced, replacing the standard DSTU 2586-94 according to the decree of the State Standard of Ukraine.

On July 1, 2015 the standard DSTU 4100-2014 was introduced, replacing the standard DSTU 4100-2002 according to the order of the Ministry of Economy of Ukraine No. 1484 dated December 29, 2014.

On November 1, 2021, a new standard DSTU 4100:2021 for road signs in Ukraine was introduced, replacing the standard DSTU 4100-2014. According to this standard, signs will be easier to read, and their accumulation is prohibited. The main difference is that the names of settlements will have a different font and will be capitalized, not uppercased. There is also a new typeface, called Road UA, that will be used. The new standard provides:

- Layout of road signs of individual design according to the new principle;
- The text must begin with a capital letter;
- Arrows have a new shape;
- European symbols are used to indicate the center of the settlement and the river;
- Defined clear proportions and distances between the elements, depending on the size of the capital letter, which is chosen based on the location of the sign and the category of the road;
- Transliteration of names of settlements is provided.

In addition, this standard will have a new designation of diagonal pedestrian crossings and a new sign for safety islands. Signs and signs to road signs for the development of cycling infrastructure will also be updated.

== Warning signs ==
Warning signs (Ukrainian: Попереджувальні знаки) are an upward-pointing red triangle, with white backgrounds and black pictograms. Yellow backgrounds are used for temporary dangers or roadworks conditions. Signs may include additional plates detailing the danger, who the signs apply to, or other necessary information.

Curve to the right

Curve to the left

Double curve, first to right

Double curve, first to left

Chevron right

Chevron left

T Chevron

Chevron right

Chevron left

Chevron right

Chevron left

Road narrows on both sides

Road narrows on the right

Road narrows on the left

Steep climb

Steep descent

Unprotected quay of riverbank ahead

Tunnel ahead

Uneven road

Hump

Dip

Slippery road

Loose road surface

Dangerous shoulder

Falling rocks

crosswinds area

Low-flying aircraft

Roundabout

Tramway crossing

Crossroad with priority (give way to vehicles coming to the right)

Intersection with a minor road

Minor road on right

Minor road on left

Staggered crossroads with first on right

Staggered crossroads with first on left

Traffic lights

Drawbridge

Two-way traffic

Railway crossing ahead that is protected by automatic gates

Railway crossing ahead that is not protected by automatic gates

Railroad crossbuck (single-track)

Railroad crossbuck (multi-track)

Countdown beacon to railroad crossing on right side of road (240 meters to crossing)

Countdown beacon to railroad crossing on right side of road (160 meters to crossing)

Countdown beacon to railroad crossing on right side of road (80 meters to crossing)

Countdown beacon to railroad crossing on left side of road (240 meters to crossing)

Countdown beacon to railroad crossing on left side of road (160 meters to crossing)

Countdown beacon to railroad crossing on left side of road (80 meters to crossing)

Pedestrian crossing ahead

Children

Bicycle crossing

Cattle crossing

Deer crossing

Roadworks

Traffic queues

Other dangers

Change of road surface type

Accident area

== Priority signs ==
Priority signs (Ukrainian: Знаки пріоритету) regulate the movement of vehicles in an orderly fashion. The priority road sign tells drives that they have priority at all intersections ahead on the road until the end sign. The traffic bottleneck signs are used where the road is too narrow to permit vehicles to pass side-by-side, but rather must alternate.

Give way

Stop

Priority road

End of priority road

Give priority to oncoming traffic

Priority over oncoming traffic

== Prohibitory signs ==
Prohibitory signs (Ukrainian: Заборонні знаки) regulate the use of the road based on movement, classes of vehicles, or other restrictions.

Road closed to all vehicles

No cars

No trucks

No vehicles with trailers

No tractors

No motorcycles

No mopeds

No bicycles

No pedestrians

No handcarts

No horse-drawn carts

No vehicles carrying dangerous goods

No vehicles carrying explosives and flammable goods

No vehicles carrying substances to cause water pollution

No vehicles over 7 tonnes

No vehicles over 5 tonnes per axle

No vehicles wider than 2.7 meters

No vehicles higher than 3.5 meters

No vehicles longer than 10 meters

Drivers must maintain a distance of at least 70 meters

No entry

No right turn

No left turn

No U-turn

No overtaking

End overtaking prohibition

No overtaking by trucks

End overtaking prohibition for trucks

Speed limit

End of speed limit (limit reverts to default for road class)

Speed limit zone

End of speed limit zone (limit reverts to default for road class)

No honking to all vehicles

No stopping

No parking

No parking on odd-numbered days

No parking on even-numbered days

No parking zone

End of no parking zone

Stop at customs

Stop for other control

End of all restrictions and prohibitions

Stop for dangers, including traffic accidents, natural disasters or other road obstructions

Road closed to the displayed vehicles

Road closed to the displayed vehicles

== Mandatory signs ==
Mandatory signs (Ukrainian: Наказові знаки) instruct drivers on actions they must take or obey, or may mark types of vehicles permitted to use the road.

Proceed straight only

Turn right only

Turn left only

Proceed straight or turn right

Proceed straight or turn left

Turn left or right (no straight ahead)

Keep right

Keep left

Keep right or left

Roundabout

Road for movement of passenger cars

Minimum speed limit

End of minimum speed limit

Bicycle path

End of bicycle path

Pedestrian path

Bicycle and pedestrian path

Adjacent bicycle and pedestrian paths

Adjacent pedestrian and bicycle paths

Equestrian path

Vehicles carrying dangerous goods may proceed straight ahead only

Vehicles carrying dangerous goods may turn right only

Vehicles carrying dangerous goods may turn left only

Traffic using anti-slip chains

End of traffic using anti-slip chains

Combined cars vehicles and bicycles traffic

End of combined cars vehicles and bicycles traffic

== Information signs ==
Information signs (Ukrainian: Інформаційно-вказівні знаки) describe conditions of the road and area that do not require a danger warning, mandatory instruction or prohibition.

Expressway begins

Expressway ends

Road for motor vehicles begins

Road for motor vehicles ends

One-way street begins

One-way street ends

Rightward one-way street

Leftward one-way street

One-way street with reverse lane for buses

One-way street with reverse lane for buses ends

Rightward one-way street with reverse lane for buses

Leftward one-way street with reverse lane for buses

Lane for buses begins

Lane for buses ends

Reversible Lane begins

Reversible Lane ends

Crossing the reversible lane

Mandatory direction of lanes

Narrowing of a lane

Narrowing of a lane

Mandatory direction of a lane

Narrowing of a lane with vehicle class restriction

Additional lane on the right begins

Additional lane on the left begins

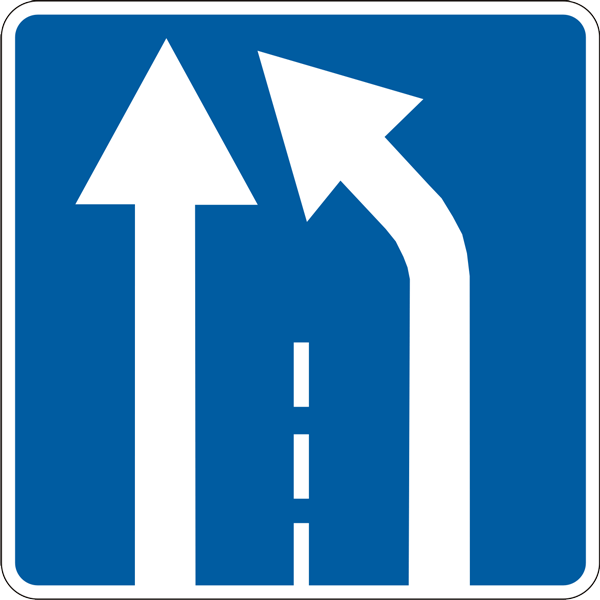
Right lane ends

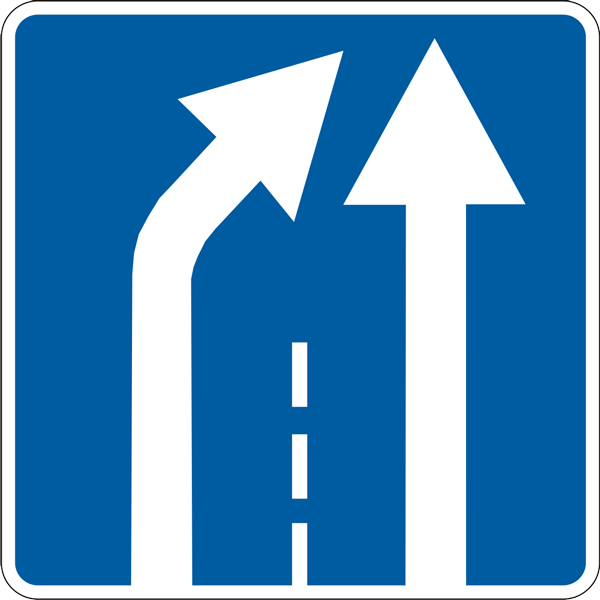
Left lane ends

Right lane merges with traffic coming from other road

Lane on the right begins with traffic coming from other road

Minimum speed on different traffic lanes.

Minimum speed in the traffic lane.

Maximum speed limit on different traffic lanes.

Lane closed, proceed into oncoming lane

Do not enter to oncoming lane, return to your lane

Emergency escape lane for runaway vehicles

U-turn place

U-turn zone

Trucks proceed straight only

Trucks proceed right only

Trucks proceed left only

Dead-end street

Dead-end street on the left

Dead-end street on the right

Advisory speed

Residential zone

Residential zone ends

Pedestrian zone

Pedestrian zone ends

Pedestrian crossing (placed on right side of road)

Pedestrian crossing (placed on left side of road)

Diagonal pedestrian crossing

Stairway down

Stairway down

Stairway up

Stairway up

Parking

Parking

Parking for trucks

Parking zone

Parking zone ends

Bus stop

Bus stop ends

Tram stop

Tram stop ends

Trolleybus stop

Trolleybus stop ends

Taxi stand

Settlement begins

Settlement ends

Village begins

Village ends

Built-up area begins

Built-up area ends

National speed limits (used at border crossings with other countries)

Other road restrictions (such as for a mountainous road ahead)

Route guide sign with destinations

Route guide sign with destinations

Route guide sign with destinations

Route guide sign with destinations

Route guide sign with destinations

Route guide sign with destinations

Route guide sign with destinations

Route guide sign with destinations

Route guide sign with destinations

Route guide sign with destinations

Route guide sign with destinations

Route guide sign with destinations

Route guide sign with destinations

Route guide sign with destinations

Destinations sign with distances

Destinations sign with distances

Alternative route to meet your destination where left turn is prohibited

Alternative route for closed road

Detour route on straight

Detour route on right

Detour route on left

Street name sign

River name sign

Route number

Road number and direction sign

Road number and direction sign

Road number and direction sign

Road distance interval marker

Stop (used where a regular stop sign is not needed, such as unprotected railway crossings)

Change of traffic pattern (new road signs ahead)

Airport

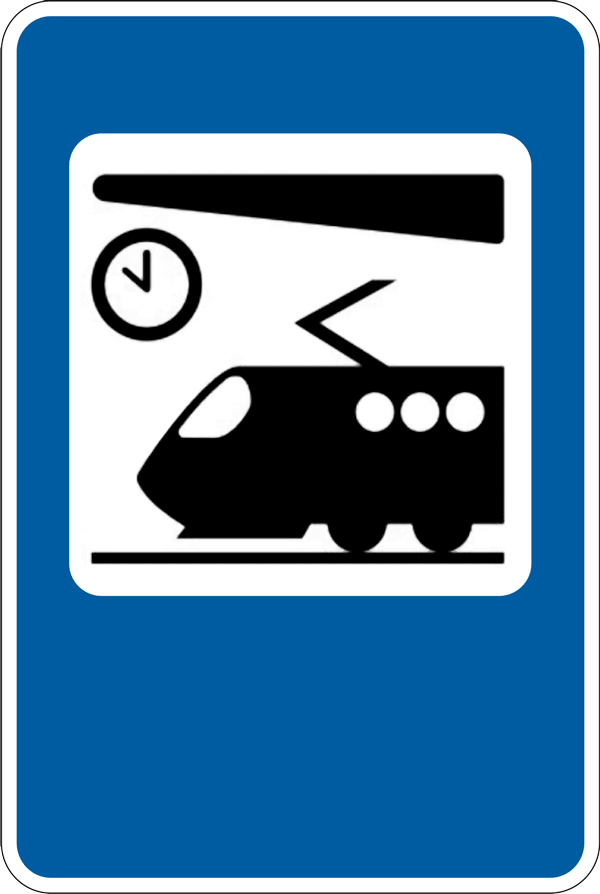
Train station

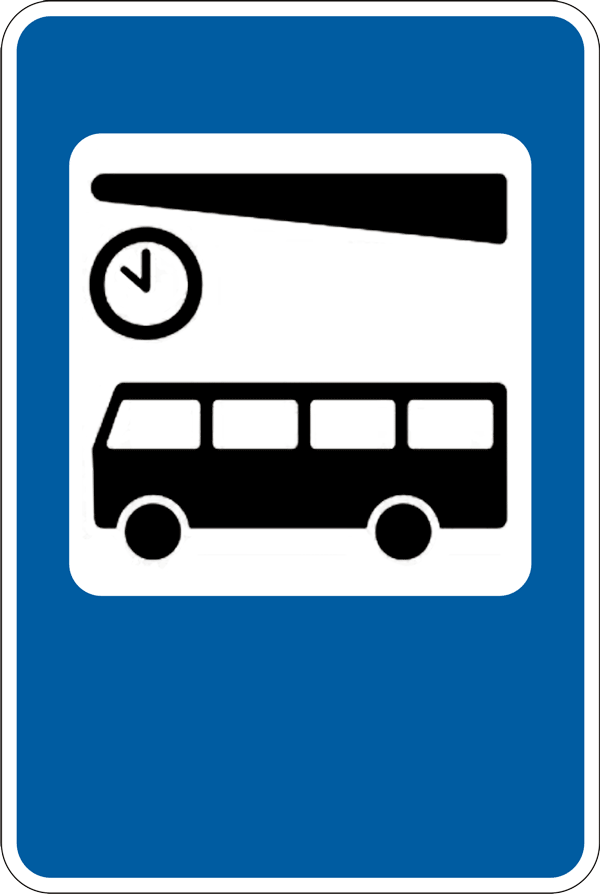
Bus station

Tunnel

End of tunnel

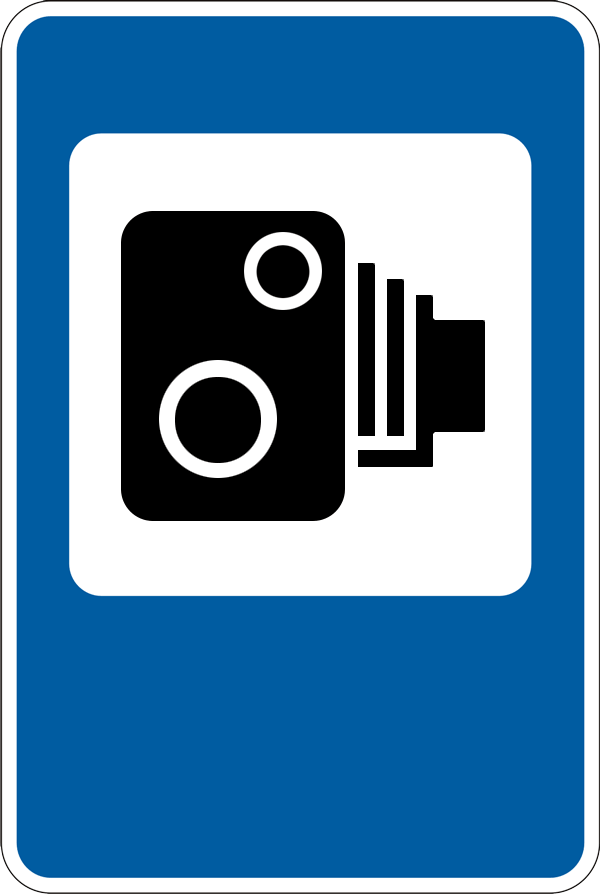
Traffic cameras area

Sea (river) port or station

Road information radio

Emergency exit

Emergency exit

Indicators of directions and distances to emergency exits

Indicators of directions and distances to emergency exits

Indicators of directions and distances to emergency exits

Expressway begins (toll/payment required)

Expressway ends (toll/payment required)

Toll road

End of toll road

Border zone

End of the border zone

Controlled border zone

End of the controlled border zone

Bicycle lane

End of bicycle lane

Bicycle and pedestrian zone

Bicycle and pedestrian zone ends

Cyclist crossing (placed on right side of road)

Cyclist crossing (placed on left side of road)

Pedestrians and Cyclist crossing (placed on right side of road)

Pedestrians and Cyclist crossing (placed on left side of road)

Contraflow bicycle lane

End of contraflow bicycle lane

Entrance to a road with one-way traffic and an oncoming bicycle lane (right)

Entrance to a road with one-way traffic and an oncoming bicycle lane (left)

Area of dimensional and weight control

End of area of dimensional and weight control

== Service signs ==
Service signs (Ukrainian: Знаки сервісу) mark the way to road services that may be required by the driver. They may include arrows, distances to, or names of the service.

First point of medical care

Hospital

Emergency phone call

Fire extinguisher

Mechanic

Car wash

Gas station

Filling-only gas station

Electric vehicle charging station

Gas station with mixed services

Gas station combined with a charging station

Gas station combined with a charging station

Gas station combined with a charging station

Calling phone

Information base

Traffic police

Bathroom area

Drinking water

Restaurant or a lunch

Cafeteria refreshments

Rest area

Hotel or motel

Tourist base

Camping grounds

Caravan parking

Camping grounds with caravan parking

Beaches or pools

National historic/cultural/tourist site

Tire fitting

== Additional plates ==
Additional plates (Ukrainian: Таблички до дорожніх знаків) provide extra information about the sign above it.

Above sign indicating a distance in 300 meters

Above sign indicating a distance to Stop in 250 meters (placed below the give way sign to warn of a stop sign)

Above sign indicating a distance in 300 meters to the left

Above sign indicating a distance in 100 meters to the right

Above sign indicating a length in 100 meters

Above sign indicating where stopping and parking prohibited in length in 30 meters on right side

Above sign indicating where stopping and parking prohibited in length in 25 meters on left side

Above sign indicating where stopping and parking prohibited in length in 10 meters

Above sign indicating where no stopping and parking ends

Above sign indicating of object on the right

Above sign indicating of object on the left

Above sign indicating where no stopping and parking in both directions

Above sign indicating of object on both sides of road

Above sign indicating a time during Saturdays, Sundays and holidays

Above sign effective during working days

Above sign effective during weekdays

Above sign effective during times

Above sign effective during Saturdays, Sundays and public holidays during times

Above sign effective during working days during times

Above sign effective during weekdays during times

Above sign applies to trucks/heavy goods vehicles

Above sign applies to vehicles pulling trailers

Above sign applies to motor vehicles

Above sign applies to buses

Above sign applies to farm vehicles/equipment

Above sign applies to motorcycles

Above sign applies to bicyclists

Above sign applies to vehicles carrying dangerous goods

Park parallel to curb

Park straddling curb (when minimum distance is possible)

Park on sidewalk (when minimum distance is possible)

Park parallel to curb

Park straddling curb (when minimum distance is possible)

Park on sidewalk (when minimum distance is possible)

45° degree parking

No idling during parking

Diagram of road priority

Above sign applies to this lane only

Number of curves in road

Approach to ferry

Above sign applied during winter conditions

Above sign applies during precipitation

Toll/payment required

Raised viewing platform for cars

Blind pedestrians may be crossing

Disabled parking

Above sign does not apply to disabled persons

Maximum duration of parking

Temperature limit

Other danger: frontal collision area

Other danger: rear-end collision area

Other danger: collision with pedestrian likely

Other danger: collision with cyclist likely

Other danger: rollover area

Other danger: this section of road passes near ski slopes or trails, or other winter sports areas

A place for charging electric cars

Tow truck

Safety island

Period of use of daytime running light

Road marking

Type of public transport (metro)

Type of public transport (bus)

Type of public transport (trolleybus)

Type of public transport (tram)

Direction of movement of cyclists

Direction of movement of cyclists

Direction of movement of cyclists

Direction of movement of cyclists

Direction of movement of cyclists

Direction of movement of cyclists

== Historical/obsolete signs ==
There are images of historic or obsolete road signs, some of them are no longer used. However, the Soviet-style road signs and the typeface specified in the Soviet GOST 10807-78 standard may still be used in inscriptions despite the fact that the modern DSTU 4100:2021 is adopted.

Steep climb (1991–2021)

Steep descent (1991–2021)

No vehicles over 7 tonnes (1991–2021)

No vehicles over 5 tonnes per axle (1991–2014)

No vehicles wider than 2.7 meters (1991–2021)

No vehicles higher than 3.5 meters (1991–2021)

No vehicles longer than 10 meters (1991–2021)

Drivers must maintain a distance of at least 70 meters (1991–2021)

Speed limit (1991–2021)

Speed limit zone (1994–2021)

End of speed limit zone (limit reverts to default for road class) (1994–2021)

No parking zone (1994–2021)

End of no parking zone (1994–2021)

Proceed straight only (1991–2021)

Turn right only (1991–2014)

Turn left only (1991–2014)

Proceed straight or turn right (1991–2021)

Proceed straight or turn left (1991–2021)

Turn left or right (no straight ahead) (1991–2021)

Keep right (1991–2021)

Keep left (1991–2021)

Keep right or left (1991–2021)

Roundabout (1991–2021)

Pedestrian path (1991–2021)

Minimum speed limit (1991–2021)

End of minimum speed limit (1991–2021)

Motorway begins (1991–2021)

Motorway ends (1991–2021)

U-turn zone (1991–2021)

Advisory speed (1991–2021)

Stop (used where a regular stop sign is not needed, such as unprotected railway crossings) (1991–2021)

Customs (1994-2021)

Stop for other control (1994–2021)

Stop for dangers, including traffic accidents, natural disasters or other road obstructions (1994–2021)

Lane for buses begins (1994–2021)

Lane for buses ends (1994–2021)

Additional lane on the right begins with minimum speed limit for left lane (1994–2021)

Emergency escape lane for runaway vehicles (1994–2021)

Pedestrian zone (1994–2014)

Pedestrian zone ends (1994–2014)

Parking zone (1994–2021)

Parking zone ends (1994–2021)

Settlement begins (1994–2021)

Settlement ends (1994–2021)

Village begins (1994–2021)

Village ends (1994–2021)

National speed limits (used at border crossings with other countries) (1994–2021)

Other road restrictions (such as for a mountainous road ahead) (1994–2021)

Route guide sign with destinations (1994–2021)

Route guide sign with destinations (1994–2021)

Route guide sign with destinations (1994–2021)

Alternative route to meet your destination where left turn is prohibited (1994–2021)

Detour route on straight (1994–2014)

Detour route on right (1994–2014)

Detour route on left (1994–2014)

Street name sign (1994–2021)

River name sign (1994–2021)

Destinations sign with distances (1994–2021)

Road distance interval marker (1994–2021)

Road route number sign (1994–2014)

Road route number sign (1994–2014)

First point of medical care (2002–2021)

Hospital (2002–2021)

Emergency phone call (1994–2021)

Traffic police (1994–2021)

Rest homes (1994–2021)

Pedestrian hitch-hiking route (1994–2021)

Above sign enters force on date (1994–2002)

Route guide sign with destinations (1994–2014)

Route guide sign with destinations (1994–2014)

Route guide sign with destinations (1994–2021)

Route guide sign with destinations (1994–2014)

Route guide sign with destinations (1994–2014)

Alternative route for closed road (1994–2014)

Road number and direction sign (1994–2014)

Road number and direction sign (1994–2014)

Fire extinguisher (1994–2014)

Above sign enters force on date (2002–2021)

Change of road surface type (2014-2021)

No vehicles over 5 tonnes per axle (2014–2021)

End of speed limit (limit reverts to default for road class) (2014–2021)

Turn right only (2014–2021)

Turn left only (2014–2021)

Park and ride (2014–2021)

Route guide sign with destinations (2014–2021)

Route guide sign with destinations (2014–2021)

Route guide sign with destinations (2014–2021)

Route guide sign with destinations (2014–2021)

Route guide sign with destinations (2014–2021)

Route guide sign with destinations (2014–2021)

Route guide sign with destinations (2014–2021)

Route guide sign with destinations (2014–2021)

Route guide sign with destinations (2014–2021)

Alternative route for closed road (2014–2021)

Detour route on straight (2014–2021)

Detour route on right (2014–2021)

Detour route on left (2014–2021)

Destinations sign with distances (2014–2021)

Church (may include name or religious denomination) (2014–2021)

Factory (2014–2021)

New road signs ahead (2014–2021)

Above sign applies to vehicles carrying dangerous goods (2014–2021)

Green wave (2020–2021)

== See also ==
- Comparison of European traffic laws
- Comparison of European road signs
- Traffic sign
- Vienna Convention on Road Signs and Signals
