= R260 highway (Russia) =

Road in Russia

Federal Highway R260
- Федеральная автомобильная дорога Р260
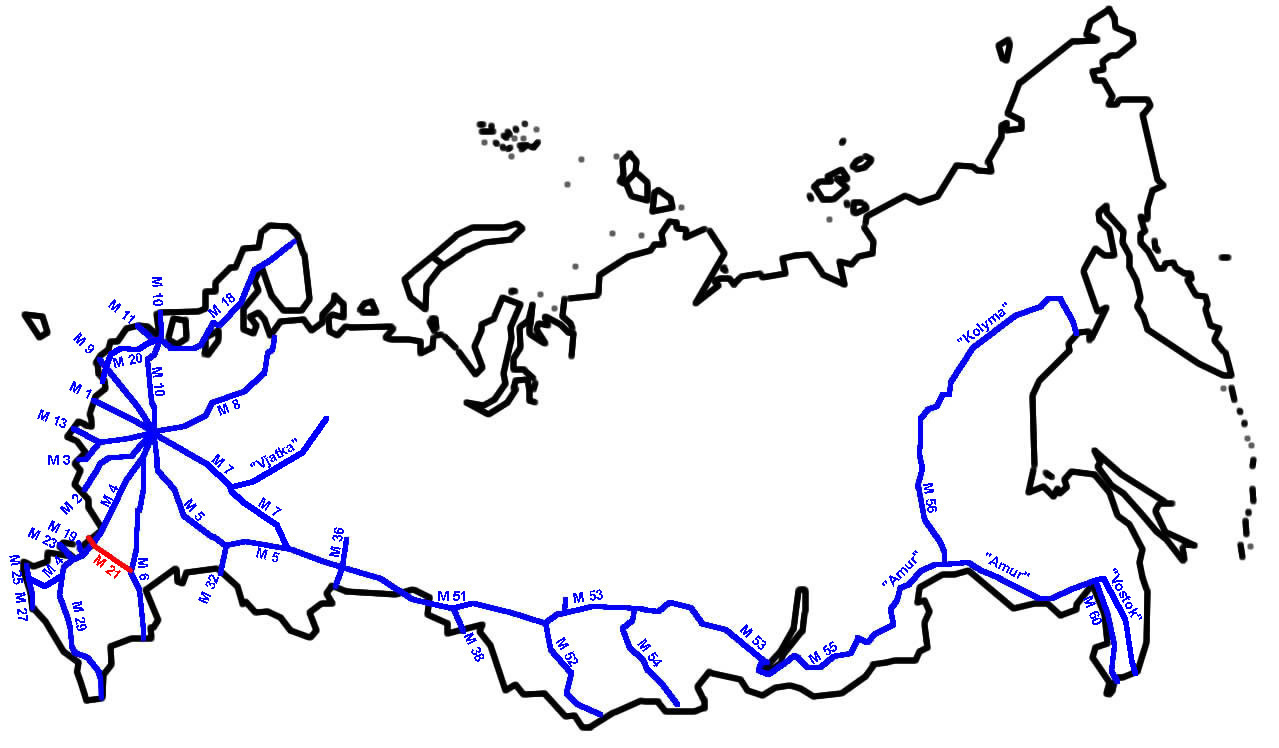

Route information
- Part of E40

- Part of AH70
- Length: 315 km(before extension in 2023) (196 mi)

Major junctions
- West end: Luhansk
- East end: R 22 in Volgograd

Location
- Country: Russia

Highway system
- Russian Federal Highways
← R 240	→ R 270

The R260 (Р260 in cyrillic scripts), previously M21 and A260 is a Russian federal highway. It runs from Volgograd, through Kamensk-Shakhtinsky to Luhansk, the Russian-occupied capital of Luhansk Oblast of Ukraine, where it continues as the M30 to Dnipro.

Formerly as M21, it was part of the Soviet trunk road network and started from Chișinău via Dnipro to Volgograd. In 2010 the section in Russia received the number A260, but the M21 designation was used until the end of 2017, when the A260 designation became official. The entire route is part of E40 and AH70.

In July 2023, as a part of their annexation works of Luhansk People's Republic that de-facto controlled city of Luhansk for nearly 10 years, the previous A260 highway has extended to Luhansk, and renamed the number to R260.
