= Highway M30 (Ukraine) =

Highway in Ukraine

Highway M30
- Автошлях М30
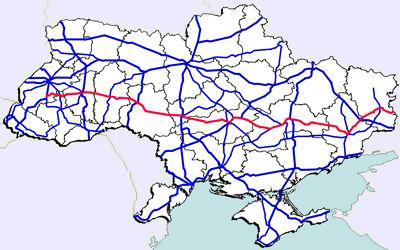

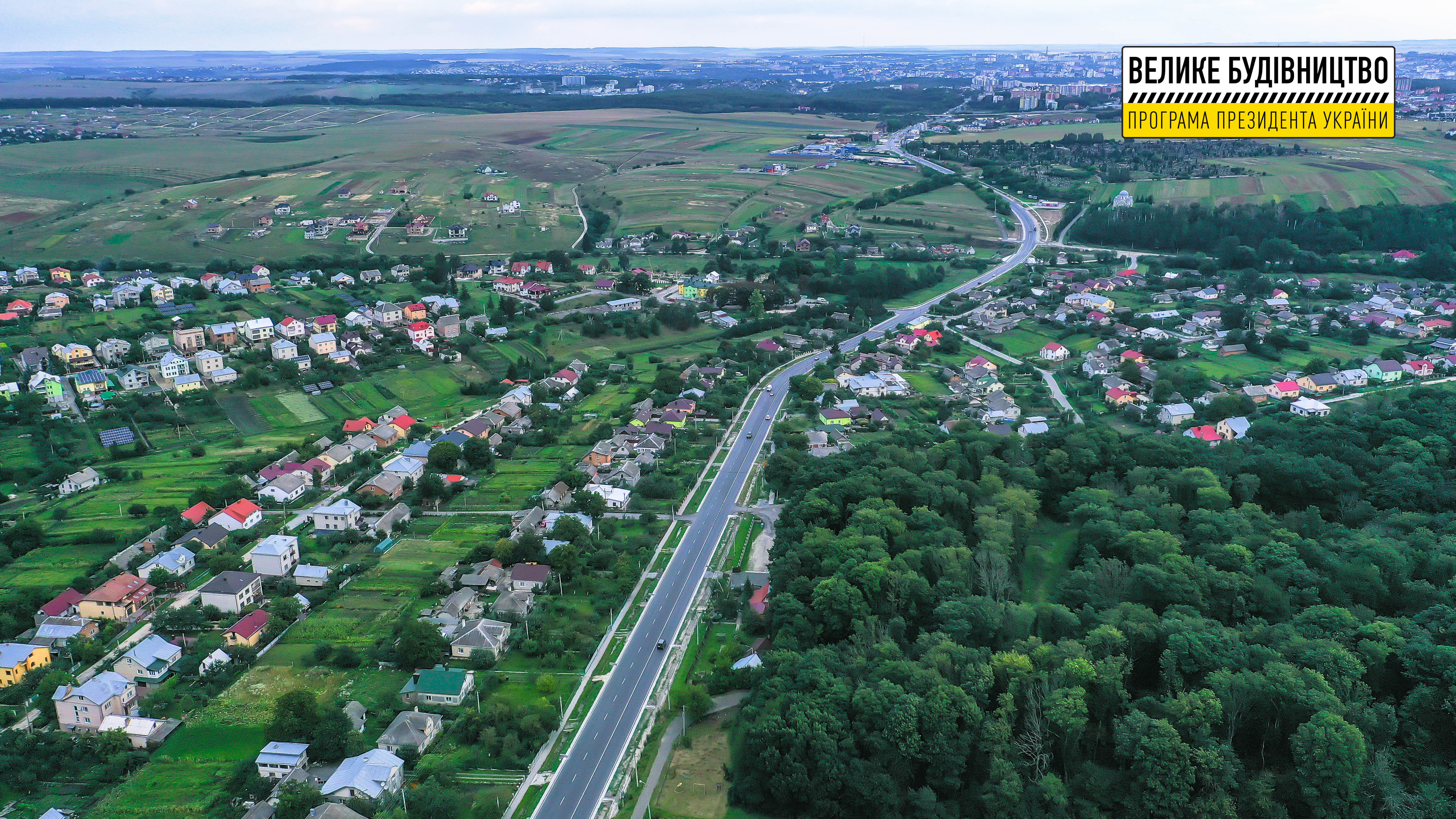

Route information
- Part of E40 E50 E584
- Existed: 28 April 2021–present

Major junctions
- West end: M 06 / H 10 in Stryi
- East end: Russian border in Izvaryne-Donetsk

Location
- Country: Ukraine
- Oblasts: Lviv, Ternopil, Khmelnytskyi, Vinnytsia, Cherkasy, Kirovohrad, Dnipropetrovsk, Donetsk, Luhansk

Highway system
- Roads in Ukraine; State Highways
← M 29

M30 is a Ukrainian international highway (M-highway) formed on 28 April 2021, with the merger of the M04 and the M12. The Stryi-Debaltseve section is part of the European route E50, the section from Debaltseve to the Russian border is part of European route E40 and the section from Oleksandriia to Kropyvnytskyi is part of European route E584. The route was formed before the 30th anniversary of Ukrainian independence. It is also dubbed the Road to Unity.

Since 2014, a part of the road in eastern Ukraine has been under the control of the separatist Donetsk People's Republic and Luhansk People's Republic. During the 2022 Russian invasion of Ukraine, Russia took direct control of areas of the road in the Donbas.
