= Highway M23 (Ukraine) =

Highway in Ukraine

Highway M23
- Автошлях М23
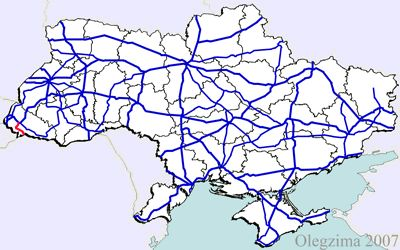

Route information
- Part of E58 E81
- Length: 49.5 km (30.8 mi)

Major junctions
- West end: M 24 in Berehove
- M 26 in Vylok
- East end: H 09 in Velyka Kopania

Location
- Country: Ukraine
- Oblasts: Zakarpattia

Highway system
- Roads in Ukraine; State Highways
← M 22	→ M 24

Highway M23 is one of the shortest Ukrainian international highway (M-highway) which connects Berehove with Khust and runs in the southern portion of the region next to the Hungarian and Romanian borders. From Berehove to the little settlement of Vylok, the M23 is part of European route E58 and European route E81 which drift off towards the Romanian border at the border checkpoint Okli on a regional route.

== Route ==
Marker	Main settlements	Notes	Highway Interchanges
0 km	Berehove		M 24
	Vylok		M 26
49 km	Velyka Kopania		H 09

== See also ==
- Roads in Ukraine
- Ukraine Highways
- International E-road network
- Pan-European corridors
