= Highway H03 (Ukraine) =

Highway in Ukraine

Highway H03
- Автошлях Н03
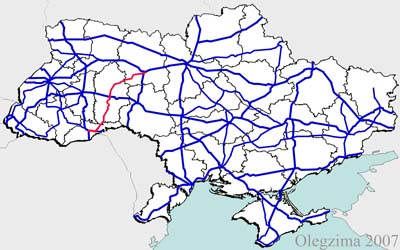

Route information
- Length: 350 km (220 mi)

Major junctions
- southwest end: P 62 in Chernivtsi
- northeast end: M 06 in Zhytomyr

Location
- Country: Ukraine
- Oblasts: Zhytomyr, Khmelnytskyi, Chernivtsi

Highway system
- Roads in Ukraine; State Highways
← H 02	→ H 05

Highway H03 is a national highway in Ukraine connecting the cities of Zhytomyr and Chernivtsi.

== Main route ==
The road has a total length of 350 km and passes through the territories of Zhytomyr, Khmelnytskyi and Chernivtsi regions. Its notable intermediary points are Chudniv, Liubar, Starokostiantyniv, Khmelnytskyi (junction with M30), Yarmolyntsi, Dunaivtsi, Kamianets-Podilskyi, Khotyn and Novoselytsia.

== Gallery ==
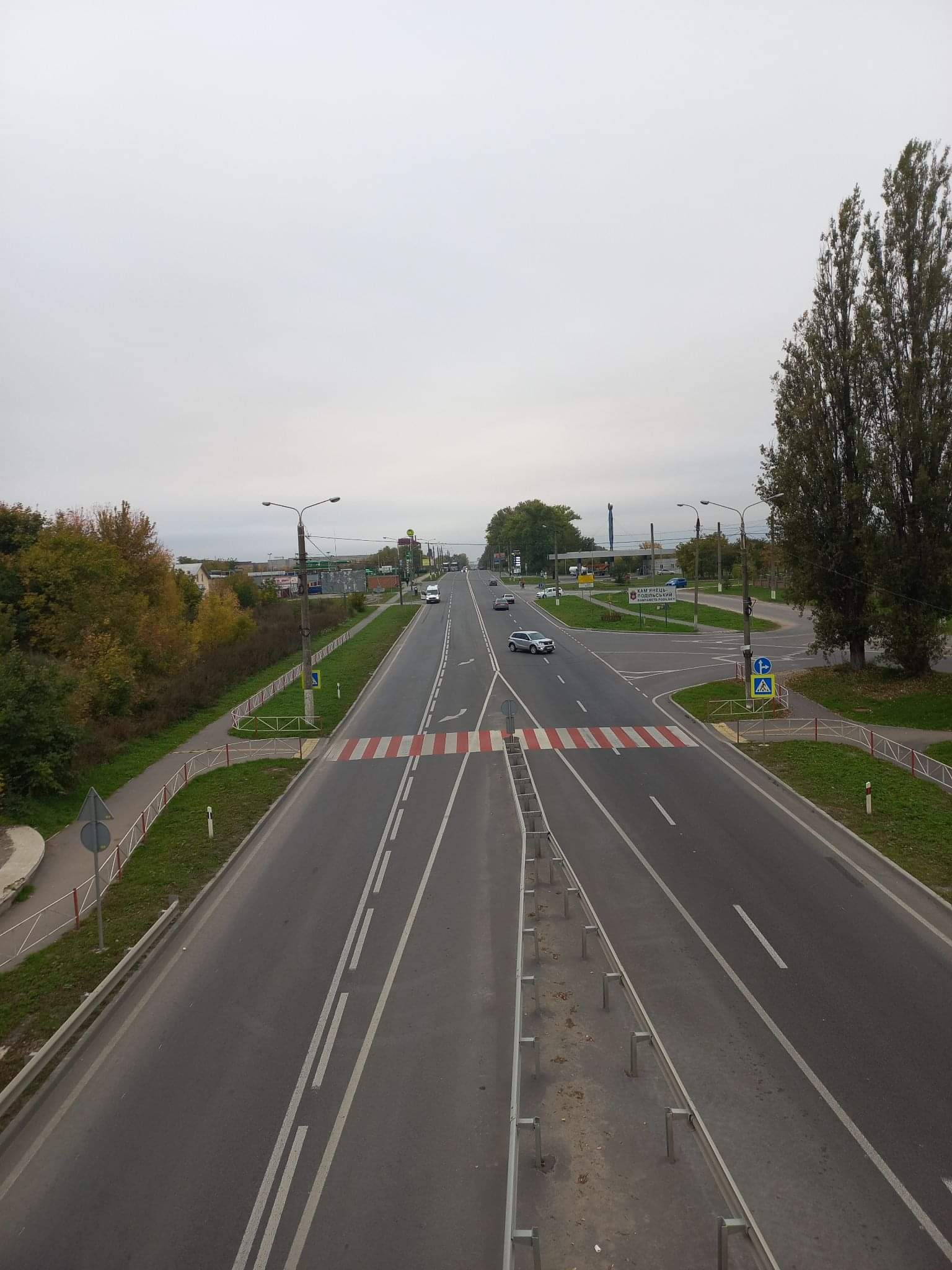
Road H03 in Kamianets-Podilskyi Raion

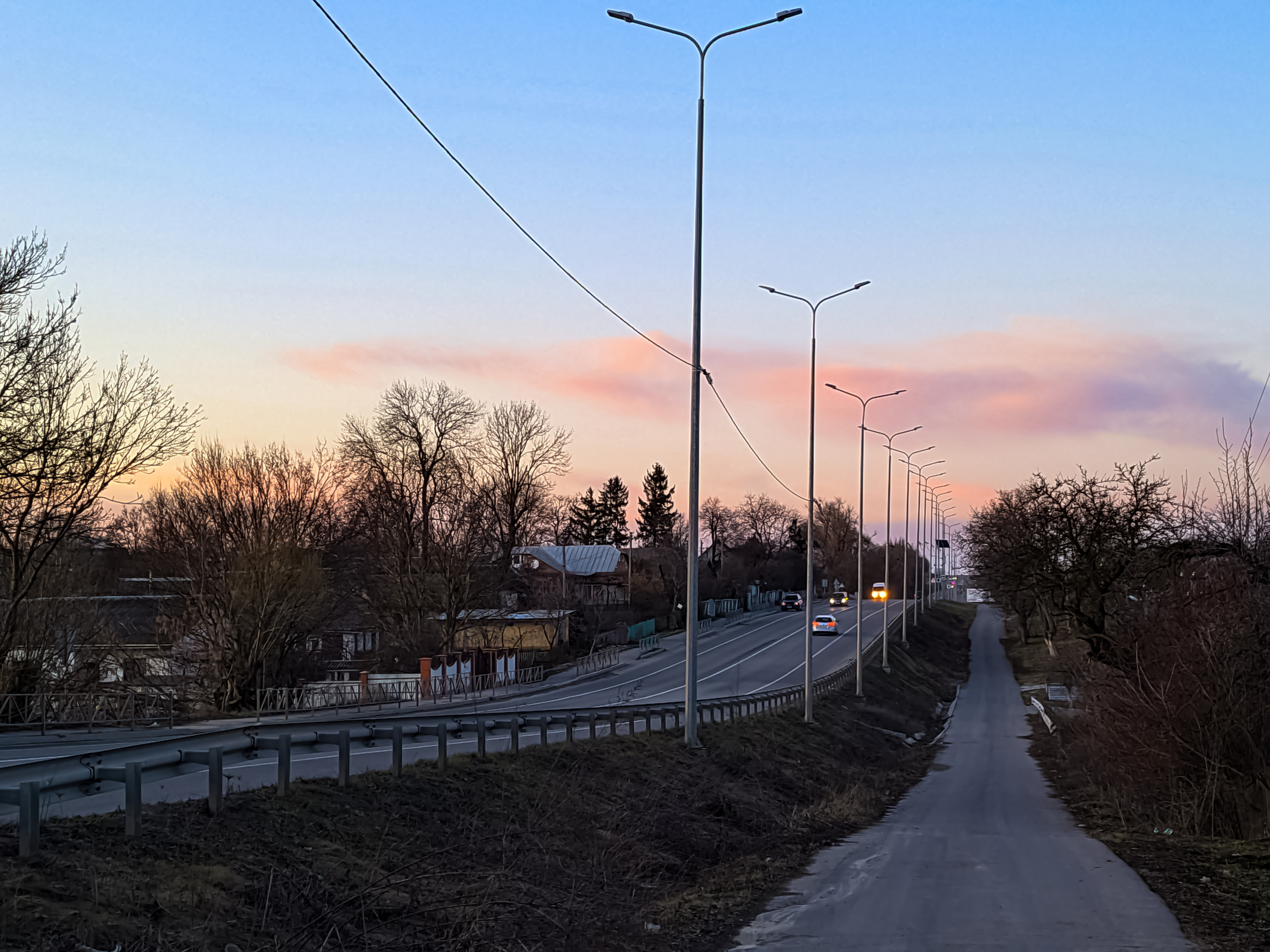
The road in the village of Antonivtsi (Yarmolyntsi settlement hromada)

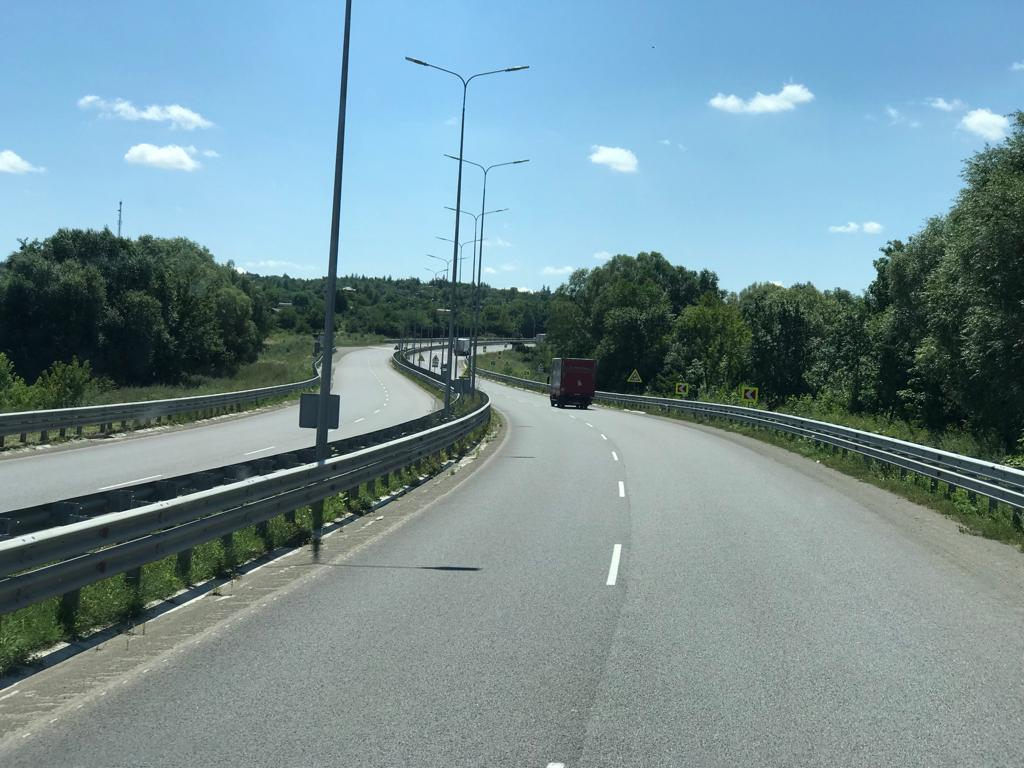
Reconstructed section of the road in the vicinity of Starokostiantyniv
