= Geographic levels =

In geography, different geographic (scale) levels are distinguished:

- The local scale level relates to a small area, usually a city or municipality;
- The regional scale level relates to a larger area, usually a region, state or province;
- The national scale level relates to a country;
- The continental scale level refers to a continent;
- The global scale applies to the entire world;
- The fluvial scale level relates to river basins (this scale level is mainly used in the context of pollution, for example).

Global and continental scale: the world with continents.

National and regional scale:The United States with all the states and regions.

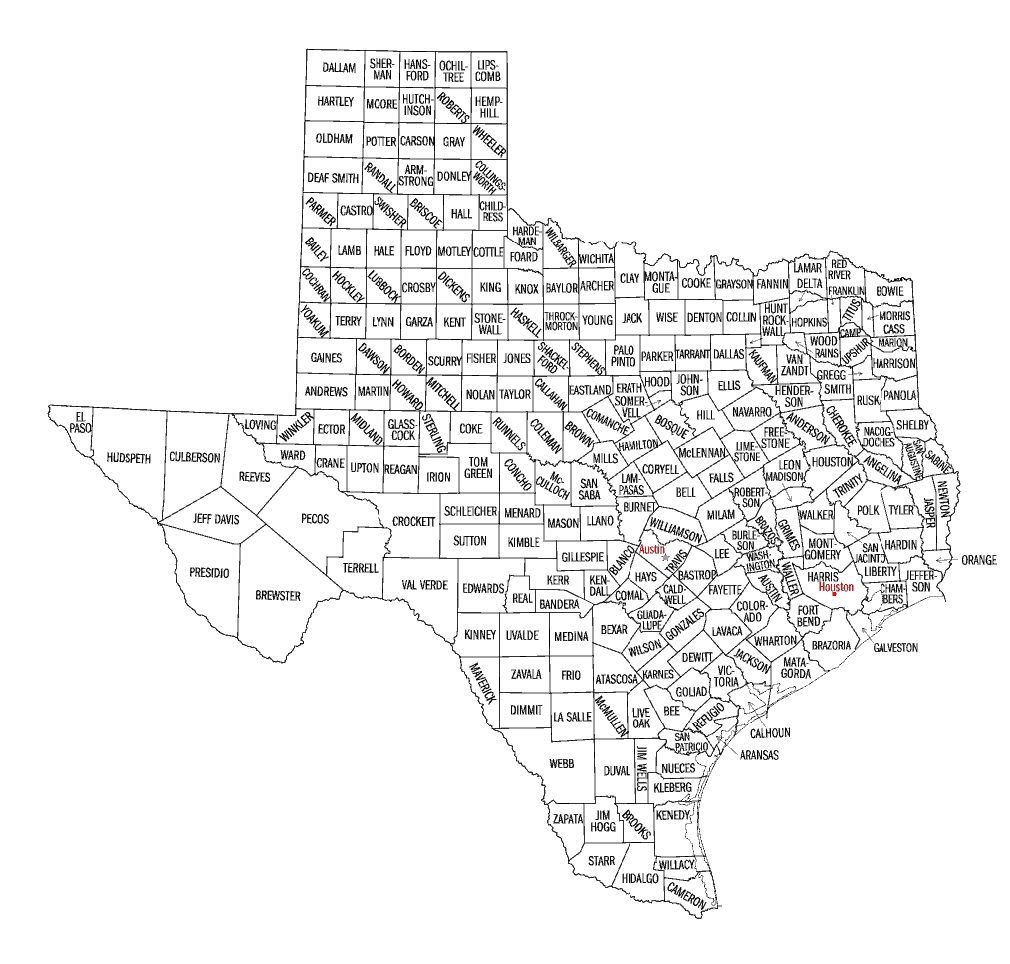
Regional and local: The state Texas with all the counties.

Within geography the use of geographic levels is also known as scales of analysis.

An area of several countries (such as the Middle East or West Africa) is sometimes counted under the continental scale level, sometimes under the regional scale. Actually, both are incorrect, because it does not include a continent but is larger than a country, while the regional scale is smaller than the national scale. Sometimes the international scale level is also used for this, but this term is not in general use.

== Use ==
- The concept is used to describe, for example, disasters, climate models, cartographic matters, epidemiological studies or effects of human actions on the environment. Using the concept of Geographic levels it is easier to describe the scale, size and impact of a phonomenon.
- Changing geographic levels helps to identify how people affected by their environment at different levels, from local to global.
- This concept enables geographers to see hidden patterns and connections in the world.
- Changing scale can uncover causes and effects of phenomena, offering a wider or more detailed view.
- Geographers use scales to choose the right area for study, compare places, link human activity to environmental health, and avoid oversimplifying complex issues.
- It is also used to present data.

== See also ==
- Level of analysis
