= Izvaryne-Donetsk =

Border crossing between Russia and Ukraine

Locaiton
- Country: Ukraine
- Location: Izvaryne, Krasnodon
- Coordinates: 48°17′15″N 39°53′35″E

Izvaryne-Donetsk is a land border crossing between Ukraine and Russia, on autoroute E40 (Ukraine M 04) in the Donbas region.

On the Ukrainian side, it is in the town of Izvaryne in Krasnodon city municipality, within Luhansk Oblast. On the Russian side it is in the city of Donetsk within Rostov Oblast.

== Description ==
The type of crossing is automobile, status - international. The types of transportation for automobile crossings are passenger and freight. The railway border crossing is accessed through the Izvaryne railway station.

The port of entry is part of the Izvaryne customs post of Luhansk Oblast customs.

The railway crossing for cargo trains is open 24 hours.

== War in Donbas region ==
The border post became part of protracted struggle between the State Border Guard Service of Ukraine and pro-Russian Donbas insurgents affiliated with the Lugansk People's Republic during the rising unrest in Ukraine in the aftermath of the 2014 Ukrainian revolution.

Multiple attacks by the insurgents upon the post were repelled. Despite this, the Border Guard was overwhelmed by insurgents on 20 June 2014, and was forced to retreat into Russian territory, where many guardsmen were captured, and later returned to Ukraine. On 23 June 2014, the Ukraine government temporarily closed the Izvaryne checkpoint to travel into or from Donets, Russia. An LPR official said on 25 June that they had gained complete control of the border post. It was reported in July that the post was used by the insurgents as vital link to supplies and reinforcements from Russia. According to the Russian Federal Security Service forty-one Ukrainian soldiers defected to Russia at Izvaryne on 27 July. Ukrainian Defence Minister Valeriy Heletey confirmed that 41 Ukrainian soldiers had crossed into Russia and that this case was investigated.

On September 10, 2014, the Border Guard Service of Ukraine reported that from the Russian side the checkpoint was crossed by 12 tanks, 48 BTRs, 1 BRDM, 20 vehicles "Ural" full of ammunition, 8 vehicles "Ural" with troops, 4 vehicles of anti-air defense, and 5 fuelers all of them were heading towards Krasnodon. In the opposite direction Ukraine left several military vehicles "KamAZ", 6 vehicles "Ural", 3 tractor-trailers, and 2 fuelers.

== See also ==
- Russia–Ukraine border
- State Border of Ukraine
- European route E40 topics
- Highway M04 (Ukraine)
- War in Donbas topics
