= Pan-European Corridor IX =

Finland-Greece road and rail investment priority area

- Pan-European Corridor IX highlighted in red

Route information
- Length: 3,400 km (2,100 mi)

Major junctions
- Start end: Helsinki (Finland)
- End end: Alexandroupolis (Greece)

Location
- Countries: Finland, Russia, Belarus, Lithuania, Ukraine, Moldova, Romania, Bulgaria and Greece.

Highway system
- Pan-European corridors

The Corridor IX is one of the Pan-European corridors. It runs between Helsinki in Finland and Alexandroupolis in Greece. The corridor follows the route: Helsinki - Vyborg - Saint Petersburg - Moscow - Kyiv - Chișinău - Bucharest - Ruse - Stara Zagora - Dimitrovgrad - Alexandroupolis.

== Branches ==
Corridor IX has 3 branches:

- Branch A - Klaipėda - Vilnius - Minsk - Gomel
- Branch B - Kaliningrad - Vilnius - Minsk - Gomel
- Branch C - Liubashivka - Rozdilna - Odesa
