= Highway H08 (Ukraine) =

Highway in Ukraine

Highway H08
- Автошлях Н08
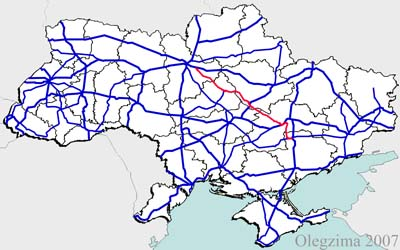

Major junctions
- North end: M 03 E40 P03 in Boryspil
- South end: M 14 E58 in Mariupol

Location
- Country: Ukraine
- Oblasts: Kyiv, Cherkasy, Poltava, Kirovohrad, Dnipropetrovsk, Zaporizhzhia, Donetsk

Highway system
- Roads in Ukraine; State Highways
← H 07	→ H 09

H08 is an important Ukraine national highway (H-highway) in Kyiv, Cherkasy, Poltava, Kirovohrad, Dnipropetrovsk, Zaporizhzhia and Donetsk Oblasts.

H08 begins in Boryspil, passes through Pereyaslav, Zolotonosha, Hradyzk, Kremenchuk, Verkhnodniprovsk, Kamianske and Dnipro. Until 9 August 2017, the highway ended in the city of Zaporizhzhia, but a resolution of the Cabinet of Ministers changed its final destination to Mariupol.

In October 2020, work began on the construction of the southern bypass of Dnipro (7 km long). The new road will connect the H08 motorway with the South Bridge, then the M18-E105 international highway, as well as the junction with the new airport.

== See also ==
- Roads in Ukraine
- Ukraine State Highways
