= Roads in Ukraine =

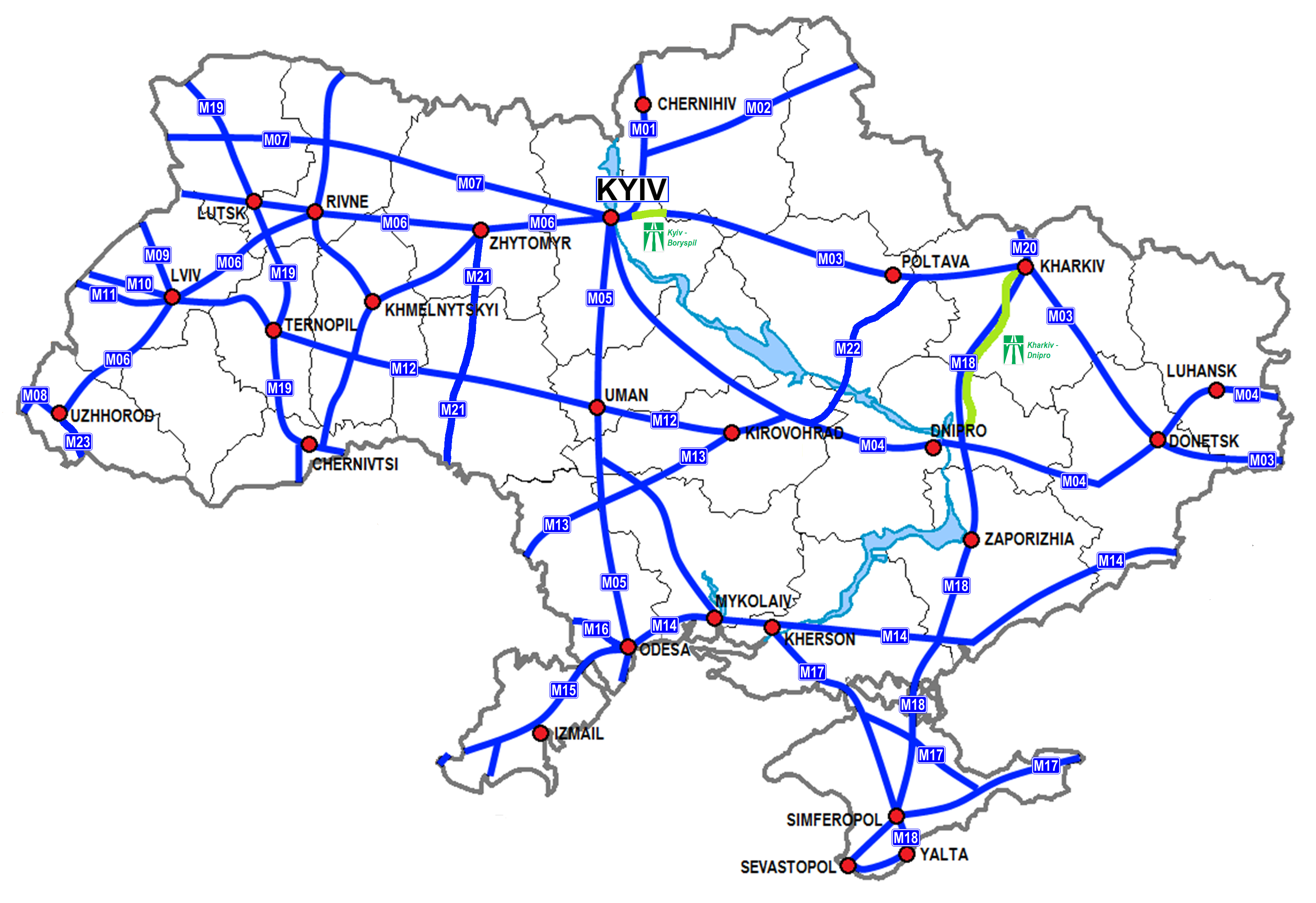
Ukrainian major road network: trunk roads (M-highways) (some of which are expressways) in blue, and avtomahistral (motorway) in green

Roads in Ukraine's transportation network are divided into two main categories: general-use roads, which consist of streets and roads in cities, villages, and other populated areas; and specialized roads, which include official, private, and special-use roads. Most members of the public travel on general-use roads, the most prominent of which are part of the international E-road network. However, high-speed highways, locally known as avtomahistrali (motorways) or shvydkisni dorohy (expressways), are rare and only exist on certain segments of major routes. In early 2010, in preparation for Ukraine co-hosting the UEFA Euro 2012 football tournament, significant infrastructure improvement projects were announced by the newly-established Ministry of Infrastructure of Ukraine, then headed by Borys Kolesnikov. These efforts fell short of expectations in some areas, and the road network at-large is still in need of significant renovation.

Ukraine inherited its transportation network from the Ukrainian SSR (Soviet Ukraine), whose roads were integrated into the larger Soviet road system. In 1940, Ukraine had only 270,700 kilometers of roads, only 10.8% of which had paved surfaces. The present-day road network was mostly built during the 1960s and 1970s. 99% of roads in the modern network are public-use, of which 12% are considered to have 'national importance' and 87% to have 'local importance'. The whole network of all automobile roads (roadways) is approximately 169,000 km (105,000 mi) long, of which 165,000 km (103,000 mi) is hard surfaced. Some critics point out that road conditions and road safety are in dangerous states of disarray.

Beginning in 2020, the "Great Construction" project facilitated the reconstruction or renovation of many roads. The Russian invasion of Ukraine has also heavily impacted infrastructure work in the country, leading to billions of dollars (USD) in construction costs. In 2023 alone, the Government of Ukraine reported making more than 2,000 kilometers of emergency repairs on motorways, highways, and other national roads.More than 25,000 km (16,000 mi) of state and local roads, and 344 bridges and overpasses, were destroyed or damaged as a result of the invasion.

== Overview ==
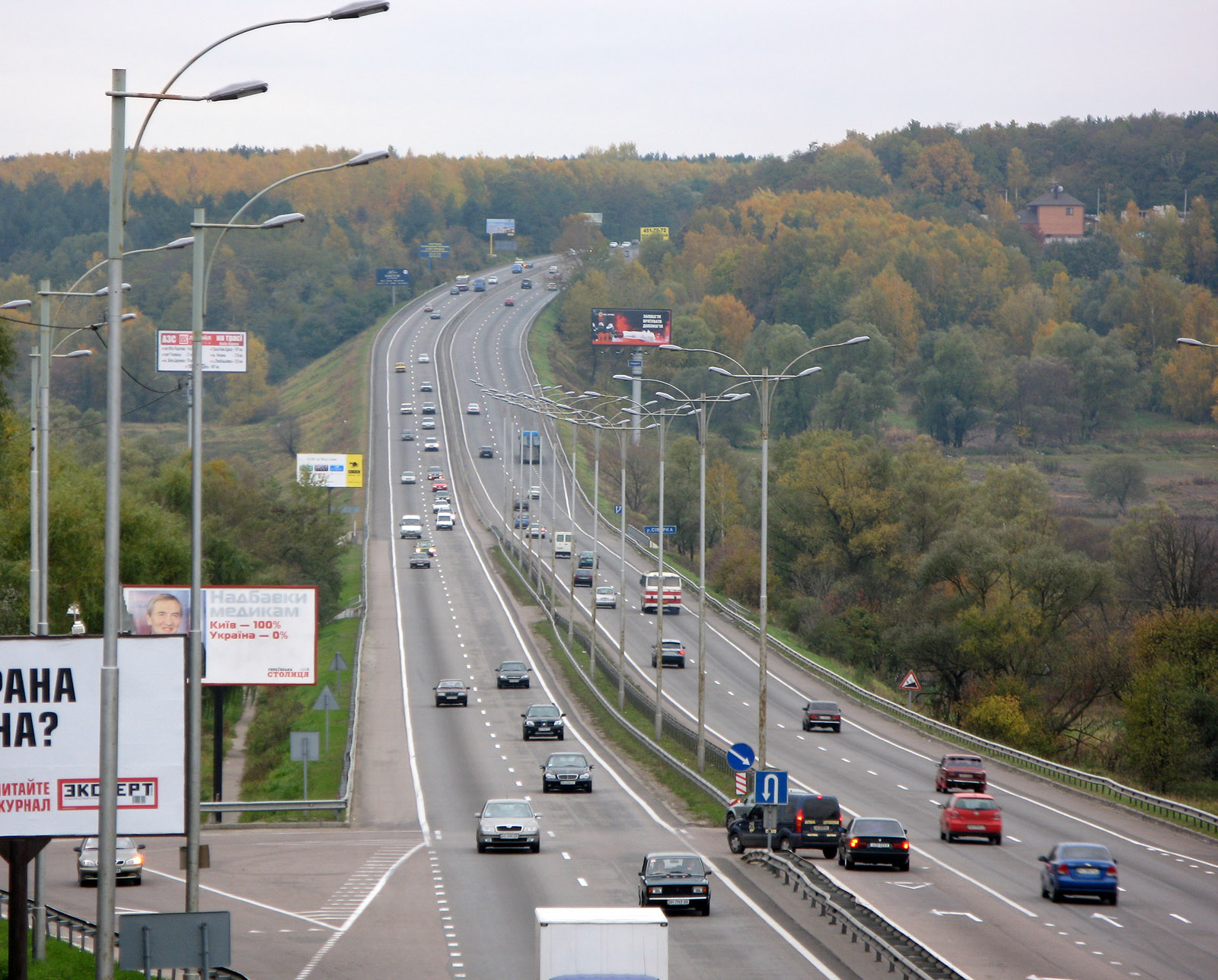
Section of the M 05 highway near Kyiv.

After the fall of the Soviet Union, all road service state bodies within Ukraine were reorganized. Ukravtodor was established as a state agency and corporation in 1990, replacing the Ministry of Roadways of Soviet Ukraine as the body governing automobile roads in modern Ukraine. It is supplemented by a project institute Ukrhiprodor which designs objects of road management. Ukravtodor is supervised by the Ministry of Infrastructure of Ukraine. On February 28, 2002, the state-owned open stock company Avtomobilni dorohy Ukrainy (ADU, lit. 'Ukrainian motor roads') was created by Presidential Decree. The company was directly involved in road construction and maintenance. In 2016 ADU was merged into Ukravtodor, and the latter now owns 100% of ADU's shares.

In 2015, the World Bank Group approved a US$560 million loan to improve road conditions in Ukraine, particularly along the M03 route between Poltava and Kharkiv.

In 2016, many of Ukraine's major provincial highways were in very poor condition, with Ukravtodor reporting that 97% of the country's roads needed repair. This high figure was attributed mostly to corruption-driven budget allocations and to lackluster enforcement of weight restrictions on trucks. That same year, the road repair budget was set at about ₴20 billion. In 2017, the Groysman government began a three year large-scale renovation of Ukraine's motorway infrastructure, with the road budget increasing to ₴42 billion in 2018, ₴51 billion in 2019, and reaching a record high of ₴70 billion in 2020.

Ukraine's increased efforts at road maintenance and construction have shown some tangible results: on the World Economic Forum's Quality of Roads Report, Ukraine rose from 139th place in 2014 to 119th place in 2019, improving 20 places in five years.

== Classifications ==

The state highways have the index letters of M, H, P, and T, each standing for a respective letter in Cyrillic. These 'state-importance' roads are utilized by the European E-network of highways.

- Both the M-network (Ukrainian: Міжнародні, romanized: Mizhnarodni - International) and the H-network (Ukrainian: Національні, romanized: Natsionalni - National) of roads use two-digit numbers ranging from 01 to 33. These roads are designed for major transportation corridors across the country and form part of the European highway system.
- The P-network (Ukrainian: Регіональні, romanized: Rehionalni - Regional) of roads also uses two-digit numbers, ranging from 01 to 84.
- The T-network (Ukrainian: Територіальні, romanized: Terytorialni - Territorial) of roads form the territorial network within each of the first-level administrative divisions of Ukraine (oblasts of Ukraine), and their index is a four-digit number where two of the digits identify the region where a given road is located.

=== Avtomahistral ===

In Ukraine, a high-speed divided highway or motorway is called an avtomahistral (Ukrainian: автомагістраль). Currently, these act not as a distinct route network, but rather as a standard to which portions of the M-roads are adapted.

In the late 2000's, two of the first improved avtomahistral motorways were opened: the Kyiv – Boryspil route (Ukrainian: Автомагістраль Київ - Бориспіль), which takes up the segment of the M03 road connecting the capital with Boryspil International Airport; and the M29 which connects Kharkiv and Dnipro by running parallel with the M18. The Kyiv – Boryspil freeway stretches for 18 km (11 mi) and has a traffic capacity of 40,000 vehicles per day.

=== Road characteristics categories ===
Beyond classification by geographic levels, the roads in Ukraine are also categorized by their ability to handle varying degrees of traffic. There are five categories, with Category I split into A and B subcategories. Although all Category I roads are considered "avtomahistral", not all of them would be considered real motorways. Since around 2010, the two major avtomahistrals, Kyiv – Boryspil and Kharkiv – Dnipro, have been deemed the top roads of category IA.

Categories	IA	IB	II	III	IV	V
Average traffic intensity daily (in vehicles)	>7,000	>7,000	>3,000-7,000	>1,000-3,000	>200-1,000	<200
Maximum traffic intensity daily (in vehicles)	>14,000	>14,000	>6,000-14,000	>2,000-6,000	>400-2,000	<400
Estimated traffic speed (km/h)	130	110	90	90	90	90
Number of lanes in both directions	4-6	4-6	2	2	2	1 (total)
Width of lanes (m)	3,75	3,75	3,75	3,75	3,5	4,5
Width of median (m)	6	5	-	-	-	-
Width of an edge reinforced lane on median (m)	1	1	-	-	-	-
Width of an edge reinforced lane on roadside (m)	0,75	0,75	0,75	0,5	-	-
Total road width (m)	28,5	27,5	15	12	10	6
Radius of a curvature on a turn (m)	1,200	800	800	600	300	150
Maximum lengthwise gradient (per mil)	30	40	40	50	60	70

== List of international E-road network routes in Ukraine ==
The international E-road network and its 'European routes' run throughout the continent of Europe, in addition to adjacent islands, parts of Central Asia, the Caucasus, and Asia Minor. The European routes in Ukraine mostly travel along Ukrainian 'M-network' or 'International' roads.

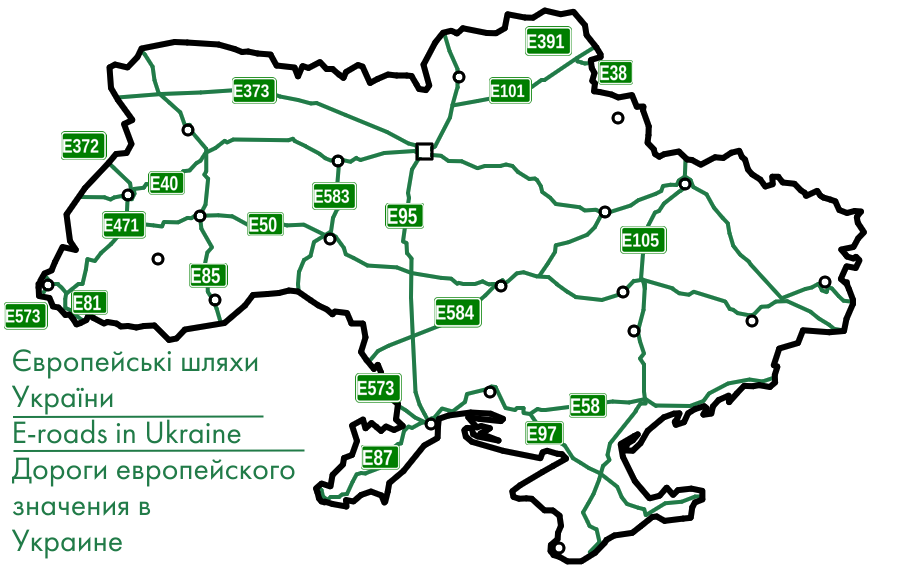
International E-road network in Ukraine, approximately as of 2022

In the list below, main routes are indicated by a green background. These have numbers ending in either zero (0) or five (5). Obsolete routes are indicated by a red background. Odd-numbered routes run north-south and even-numbered routes run east-west.

Highway	Local routes	Length in Ukraine	Notes
E38	P 65	37 km	The shortest (Ukraine-only length)
E40	M 10 – M 06 – M 03 – M 04	1334 km	The longest (Ukraine-only length)
E50	M 08 – M 06 – M 12 – M 04 – M 03		
E58	M 08 – M 06 – P 54 – M 23 – P 55 ... (Moldova) ... M 16 – M 14		
E81	P 54 – M 23 – P 55/DN1C	41 km	
E85	M 19 – M 19		
E87	M 15		
E93	Changed to E95		
E95	M 01 – M 05 ... (Turkey)	692 km	Ferry service in Odesa
E97	M 17 ... (Russia)	423.6 km	Uses Kerch Strait ferry
E101	M 01 – M 02		
E105	M 18 – M 20	777 km	
Auxiliary routes
E372	M 09	62.5 km	
E373	M 07	486.5 km	
E381	Kyiv – Hlukhiv		
E391	Hlukhiv (same as E101)	160 km	
E471	M 06	221 km	Located entirely within Ukraine
E573	M 06	26 km	
E577	Changed to E584		
E581	M 16	58.7 km	
E583	M 21	260 km	
E584	M 13 – M 12 – M 04 – M 22	507 km	

=== Transportation corridors ===
Ten Pan-European corridors for transport were defined in 1994 with the goal of improving connectivity in Central and Eastern Europe. Ukraine houses portions of three of these corridors: III (Brussels – Dresden – Kraków – Kyiv), V (Venice – Budapest – Lviv – Kyiv), and IX (Helsinki – Saint-Petersburg – Homiel – Kyiv – Chișinău – Bucharest – Thrace).

== Border checkpoints ==
Country	Highway	Nearest settlement	Region
Russia	E101	Bachivsk	Sumy
Russia	E58	Novoazovsk	Donetsk
Russia	E50	Dovzhanskyi	Luhansk
Russia	E105	Shcherbakivka	Kharkiv
Russia	E40	Izvaryne	Luhansk
Poland	E40	Shehyni	Lviv
Poland	E40	Krakivets	Lviv
Poland	E372	Rava-Ruska	Lviv
Poland	E372	Ustyluh	Volyn
Poland	E373	Yahodyn	Volyn
Hungary	E573	Kosyny	Zakarpattia
Slovakia	E50	Uzhhorod	Zakarpattia
Slovakia	E50	Maly Berezny	Zakarpattia
Moldova	E50	Kuchurhan	Odesa
Moldova	E50	Mamalyha	Chernivtsi
Moldova	E584	Platonove	Odesa
Moldova	E583	Mohyliv-Podilskyi	Vinnytsia
Romania	E81	Velyka Kopania	Zakarpattia
Romania	E87	Reni	Odesa
Romania	E85	Terebleche	Chernivtsi
Belarus	E85	Domanove	Volyn
Belarus	E95	Novi Yarylovychi	Chernihiv

== Notable roadworks projects ==
Note that some of these projects may have been affected by the Russian invasion of Ukraine from 2022 onwards.

Dnipro – Reshetylivka Highway (H-31)

As of 2020, renovation has been occurring on the H-31 highway, which connects the capital with Dnipro, a major industrial hub. The largest construction site is located in the Poltava region, where a 7-kilometre section of concrete-surface highway is being built from scratch. The bypass section around Poltava includes a 518-metre long viaduct.

Kyiv – Odesa Highway (M-05)

As of 2020, roadworks continue with the goal of reconstructing the full 453 km length of the Kyiv–Odesa Highway. Reconstruction is scheduled to finish in 2021. According to Ukravtodor, the reconstruction is "complex", requiring work on additional auxiliary road services such as the installation of weigh in motion (WiM) complexes, grade-separated intersections, and the abandonment of left-turning lanes.

Zhytomyr Northern Bypass (M-06)

As of 2020, the Northern Bypass section of the M-06 Highway around Zhytomyr is being expanded to four lanes with an increased maximum speed of 110 km/h. The project includes four multi-level interchanges and three grade-separated railway crossings. Construction is scheduled to finish in 2020.

Rivne Northern Bypass, Phase One

A two-lane bypass road is currently under construction around the city of Rivne. The first phase is a built-from-scratch 6 km road section linking the N-25 and T-18-32 highways. The project aims to relieve heavy transit traffic in the city centre and includes a 280-metre-long overpass above a ravine.

== Local importance routes ==
The 'local importance' roads have three classes but only two indexes (T and O) as the raion-level network of roads does not have an implemented index. Local road indexes are also supplemented by an oblast index noting where they are located.

Indexes of territorial roads of local importance and total length of all highways per oblast

Index	Oblast/City	Road length, km	Index	Oblast/City	Road length, km	Index	Oblast/City	Road length, km
01	Crimea	6,605	10	Kyiv Oblast	8,490	20	Ternopil Oblast	5,063
02	Vinnytsia Oblast	9,519	12	Kirovohrad Oblast	6,545	21	Kharkiv Oblast	9,551
03	Volyn Oblast	6,199	13	Luhansk Oblast	5,810	22	Kherson Oblast	4,950
04	Dnipropetrovsk Oblast	9,182	14	Lviv Oblast	8,334	23	Khmelnytskyi Oblast	7,136
05	Donetsk Oblast	8,052	15	Mykolaiv Oblast	4,831	24	Cherkasy Oblast	6,118
06	Zhytomyr Oblast	8,513	16	Odesa Oblast	8,232	25	Chernihiv Oblast	7,680
07	Zakarpattia Oblast	3,330	17	Poltava Oblast	8,836	26	Chernivtsi Oblast	2,869
08	Zaporizhzhia Oblast	6,974	18	Rivne Oblast	5,056	27	Sevastopol city
09	Ivano-Frankivsk Oblast	4,160	19	Sumy Oblast	7,281

The list is arranged in Cyrillic alphabetical order, except for Chernihiv Oblast, which precedes Chernivtsi Oblast. As an example, the territorial highway 22 in Rivne Oblast would be identified as 'T-18-22' since 18 is the index number for the Rivne Oblast. The T-network (Territorial) roads have four-digit codes, with unique two-digit identifiers within each oblast. The Oblast network (O-network) roads, on the other hand, each have six-digit codes and no secondary hyphen. For example, a highway in Kharkiv Oblast would have the code 'O-21xxxx'.

== Special routes ==
The two main technical terms for special routes in Ukraine are pid'yizd (Ukrainian: під'їзд) and ob'yizd (Ukrainian: об'їзд). A pid'yizd route is usually an access route akin to a spur that splits from the main route towards an important geographic point such as a city, airport, or park. An ob'yizd route is a type of ring road which is not necessarily complete, similar in some cases to bypass routes, business routes, or truck routes.

== Historical routes ==
- Muravsky Trail
  - Izium Trail, a branch of the Muravsky Trail
  - Kalmius Route, a branch of the Muravsky Trail
- Bila Tserkva Road
- Silk Road
- Berlad Road
- Route from the Varangians to the Greeks
- Chumak Route
- Black Route
  - Kuchma Route, a branch of the Black Route
- Romodanovsky Route
- Kraków Road
- Kolky Route
- Kyiv Route
- Zaloha Route

== Populated area roadways ==
Types of roadways in populated areas include:

- Vulytsia (street), the most common and generic type of a roadway within a populated area; the English name is becoming more widely used
- Shose, a broad limited-access road built for high-speed traffic for big distances; also defined as a generally accessible road (especially a main road) that connects cities or settlements
- Prospekt, a term for a broad, long, and straight road in big cities
- Bulvar, a scenic broad road similar to a boulevard
- Naberezhna, a roadway running along a body of water (e.g. sea, river, or lake)
- Obiizna/kiltseva, a roadway around a city
- Provulok, a backstreet or side street

== See also ==
- State Highways (Ukraine) for a list of state (national) highways
- Transport in Ukraine

== Sources ==
- International Highways in Ukraine (russian, ukrainian, english languages)
- Convention of road markings and signals
- Official text of the European agreement on International Highway System (E-Network)
- Declaration of the Cabinets Ministers of Ukrainian SSR of joining the European agreement on E-Network
- Law of Ukraine on automobile roads (highways), Law of Ukraine on road movement, Law of Ukraine on transport, Regulations for the international highways of the Commonwealth of Independent States
- Declaration of Cabinet of Minister of Ukraine on the tollway Lviv-Krakovets, Law of Ukraine on the tollway Kyiv-Odesa
- Traffic signs in Ukraine
- List of state automobile roads for general use. Cabinet of Ukraine. January 1, 2013
