= European route E40 in Ukraine =

Road

European route E 40
- Автошлях E40

Route information
- Maintained by Ukravtodor

Major junctions
- West end: E40 at Poland border
- P 44 in Hlukhiv
- East end: E40 at Russia border

Location
- Country: Ukraine

Highway system
- Roads in Ukraine; State Highways

European route E 40 (E 40) is a west–east European route, running from the port of Calais in France to Altai Mountains near Ridder in Kazakhstan.

In Ukraine, the highway runs through northern regions from the Polish border near Krakovets through Lviv, Zhytomyr, Kyiv, Poltava, Kharkiv, and Luhansk to the Russian border near Izvaryne.

== Main route ==
Route follows M 10, M 06, M 03, and M 30. It passes nine regions: Lviv Oblast, Rivne Oblast, Zhytomyr Oblast, Kyiv Oblast, Kyiv City, Poltava Oblast, Kharkiv Oblast, Donetsk Oblast, and Luhansk Oblast.

Route E40
Lviv Oblast
Yavoriv Raion
M 10 E40
Krakovets	A4 autostrada (Poland)	Poland border (1,334 kilometres (829 mi))
	P 40	near Yavoriv
Novoiavorivsk		
Lviv Raion
Ryasne-Ruske	vulytsia Tarasa Shevchenka	towards Lviv city • Lviv ring road
Kholodnovidka	M 11 • Horodotska vulytsia	access to Lviv city
	M 06 • Stryiska vulytsia	near Solonka • end point of M 10
M 06 E40
	H 09	near Pasiky-Zubrytski
	M 09	near Vynnyky
	H 17 • M 06	near Hamaliivka • (M06 city route) • Lviv ring road
Mali Pidlisky	H 17	
Zolochiv Raion
Busk		loops north of the city
Olesko		loops north of the city
	P 39	near Brody
Rivne Oblast
Radyvyliv Raion
Radyvyliv		loops north of the city
Dubno Raion
	M 19	near Dubno
Rivne Raion
Velyka Omelyana	Dubenska vulytsia	Rivne south loop
	P 05 • vulytsia Vyacheslava Chornovola	near Kvasyliv
	P 05 • Kyivska vulytsia	near Kruhle • Rivne south loop
Hoshcha Raion
	P 77	near Hoshcha
Korets Raion
Korets		loops south of the city
Zhytomyr Oblast
Zviahel Raion
Zviahel	P 49	loops north of the city
Pulyny Raion
Zhytomyr Raion
	M06 city route	Zhytomyr north loop • near Ivanivka
	M 21	near Oliivka
	M06 city route	Zhytomyr north loop • near Hlybochytsia
Korostyshiv Raion
Korostyshiv		loops north of the city
Radomyshl Raion
Brusyliv Raion
Kyiv Oblast
Bucha Raion
Kyiv
	Kyiv ring road • prospekt Peremohy	near Sviatoshyn (Kyiv) • end of M 06
Kyiv ring road E40
Borshchahivka	P 04	near Sofiivska Borshchahivka
Teremky	M 05 • Kyiv ring road • streets of Kyiv	
prospekt Akademika Hlushkova E40
Demiivka	streets of Kyiv	
Saperno-Slobidska vulytsia E40
Southern Bridge E40
prospect Mykoly Bazhana E40
Kharkivska ploshcha	M 03 • streets of Kyiv	near the Park of Partisans Glory
M 03 E40
Kyiv Oblast
Boryspil Raion
Shchaslyve	P 03	near Prolisky
Boryspil International Airport		access route
Boryspil	H 08	
	P 03	near Ivankiv
Brovary Raion
Boryspil Raion
Poltava Oblast
Pyriatyn Raion
	P 67	near Pyriatyn
Pyriatyn	P 60	
Lubny Raion
	P 42	near Lubny
Velyka Bahachka Raion
Reshetylivka Raion
	H 31	near Reshetylivka
Poltava Raion
Poltava	M 22	
	P 11	near Dudnykove
Chutove Raion
Kharkiv Oblast
Bohodukhiv Raion
Kharkiv Raion
Korotych	M 29 • E101	near Liubotyn
north route
Pisochyn	E101 • Kharkiv ring road (north/south loop)	near Nova Bavaria
	P 46	near Podvirky
Lisne	M 20	
Horyzont	Kharkiv ring road (north/south loop)	near Rohan
south route
Pisochyn	E101 • Kharkiv ring road (north/south loop)	near Nova Bavaria
Vysokyi	M 18	
Kharkiv Airport	streets of Kharkiv	
Bezliudivka	P 78	
Horyzont	Kharkiv ring road (north/south loop)	near Rohan
Chuhuiv Raion
Chuhuiv military range	P 07	
Izium Raion
Vesele	P 78	
Izium	P 79	
Donetsk Oblast
Slovyansk Raion
Slovyansk
Semenivka	H 20	near Slovyansk
Slovyansk Raion
Bakhmut Raion
Debaltseve
Debaltseve	M 30	end of M 03
M 30 E40
Luhansk Oblast
Perevalsk Raion
Lutuhyne Raion
Luhansk
Yuvileine	H 21	near Luhansk
Lutuhyne Raion
Rozkishne	H 21	near Luhansk
Krasnodon
Izvaryne	A 260	Russia border (1,334 kilometres (829 mi))

== See also ==
European route E40
Previous country: Poland	Ukraine	Next country: Russia
