= P15 road (Ukraine) =

Road in Ukraine

Road P15
- Автошлях Р15

Route information
- Length: 149.4 km (92.8 mi)

Major junctions
- north end: M 19 in Kovel
- south end: M 09 in Zhovkva

Location
- Country: Ukraine
- Oblasts: Volyn

Highway system
- Roads in Ukraine; State Highways
| ← P 14 | → P 16 |

P15 is a regional road (P-Highway) in Volyn Oblast and Lviv Oblast Ukraine. It runs north-south and connects Kovel with Zhovkva.

== Main route ==
Main route and connections to/intersections with other highways in Ukraine.

| Marker | Main settlements | Notes | Highway Interchanges |
|---|---|---|---|
Volyn Oblast
| 0 km | Kovel | (Note: exits the city as Volodymyrska vulytsia) | E85 M 19 • T0311 |
| | Volia-Kovelska | | E373 M 07 |
| | Turiysk | | T0309 |
| | Verba | (Note: runs with T0302 to Volodymyr) | T0302 |
| | Military installation at Volodymyr | splits (Note: one branch splits west when traveling south towards Khrypalychi around Volodymyr, the other through the city as Kovelska vulytsia.) | P15 spur |
| | Volodymyr | through streets (Note: runs with T0302 to Verba; road exists Volodymyr by vulytsia Heroyiv Maidanu) | H 22 |
| | Novovolynsk | (runs through) | T0305 |
Lviv Oblast
| | Khorobriv | | T1408 |
| | Boyanychi | | T1405 |
| | Ostriv | | T1404 |
| | Chervonohrad | (runs through) | T1410 • T1412 |
| | Velyki Mosty | (runs through) | |
| | Turynka | | Txxxx |
| | Zhovkva | crosses detour | E372 M 09 |
| 149.4 km | Zhovkva | | vulytsia Bohdana Khmelnytskoho (transition) • M 09 (city) • T1425 |

== Former route ==
The P15 originally ran from Kaniv to Kremenchuk. This was redesignated as P10 in 2009.

== See also ==
- Roads in Ukraine
