= Arena Lviv =

Football stadium in Lviv, Ukraine

- UEFA Category 4 Stadium
- Interactive map of Arena Lviv
- Location: Lviv, Ukraine
- Coordinates: 49°46′31″N 24°1′40″E
- Owner: Concern «Sports Arenas of Ukraine»
- Operator: «Arena Lviv»
- Capacity: 34,915 (football)
- Surface: Grass
- Field size: 105 m × 68 m (344 ft × 223 ft)

Construction
- Groundbreaking: 20 November 2008
- Built: 2008–2011
- Opened: 29 October 2011; 14 years ago
- Cost: €211 million / ₴2,287 million
- Architect: Albert Wimmer ZT Gmbh (Vienna) / Arnika (Lviv)
- General contractor: Altkom

Tenants
- FC Karpaty Lviv (2011–2012, 2016); Shakhtar Donetsk (2014–2016, 2023–present); NK Veres Rivne (2017–2018); FC Lviv (2018–2023); Rukh Lviv (2020–present)

Website
- Official website (in Ukrainian)

Arena Lviv (Ukrainian: Арена Львів) is a football stadium in Lviv, Ukraine. It was one of the eight UEFA Euro 2012 venues, where it hosted three of the group-stage games. According to the official plans, the stadium has a total seating capacity of 34,915. Both clubs FC Lviv and Rukh Lviv use the stadium for home games. Due to the Russo-Ukrainian War, the stadium is used by Shakhtar Donetsk since 2014.

== Home field ==
It was the home field of FC Karpaty Lviv in 2011–12. But Karpaty only played five games at it and returned to its original home field due to the lease price. Another club Hoverla Uzhhorod also played a home game at the stadium, due to reconstruction of Avanhard Stadium in Uzhhorod.

Due to the Russo-Ukrainian War, Shakhtar Donetsk played its home games at the stadium between July 2014 and December 2016, and after the full-scale invasion in 2022.

== Overview ==
Construction work began on 20 November 2008 and was completed by October 2011. The opening ceremony took place on 29 October, with a vast theatrical production dedicated to the history of Lviv and with the concert of the pop-star Anastacia. The first football match in the stadium was played on 15 November 2011, between Ukraine and Austria, ending with a score of 2–1. The first player to score a goal in the new stadium was Artem Milevskyi in the 16th minute (the second was an own goal and the third was scored by Marko Dević in the 91st minute).

== Construction ==
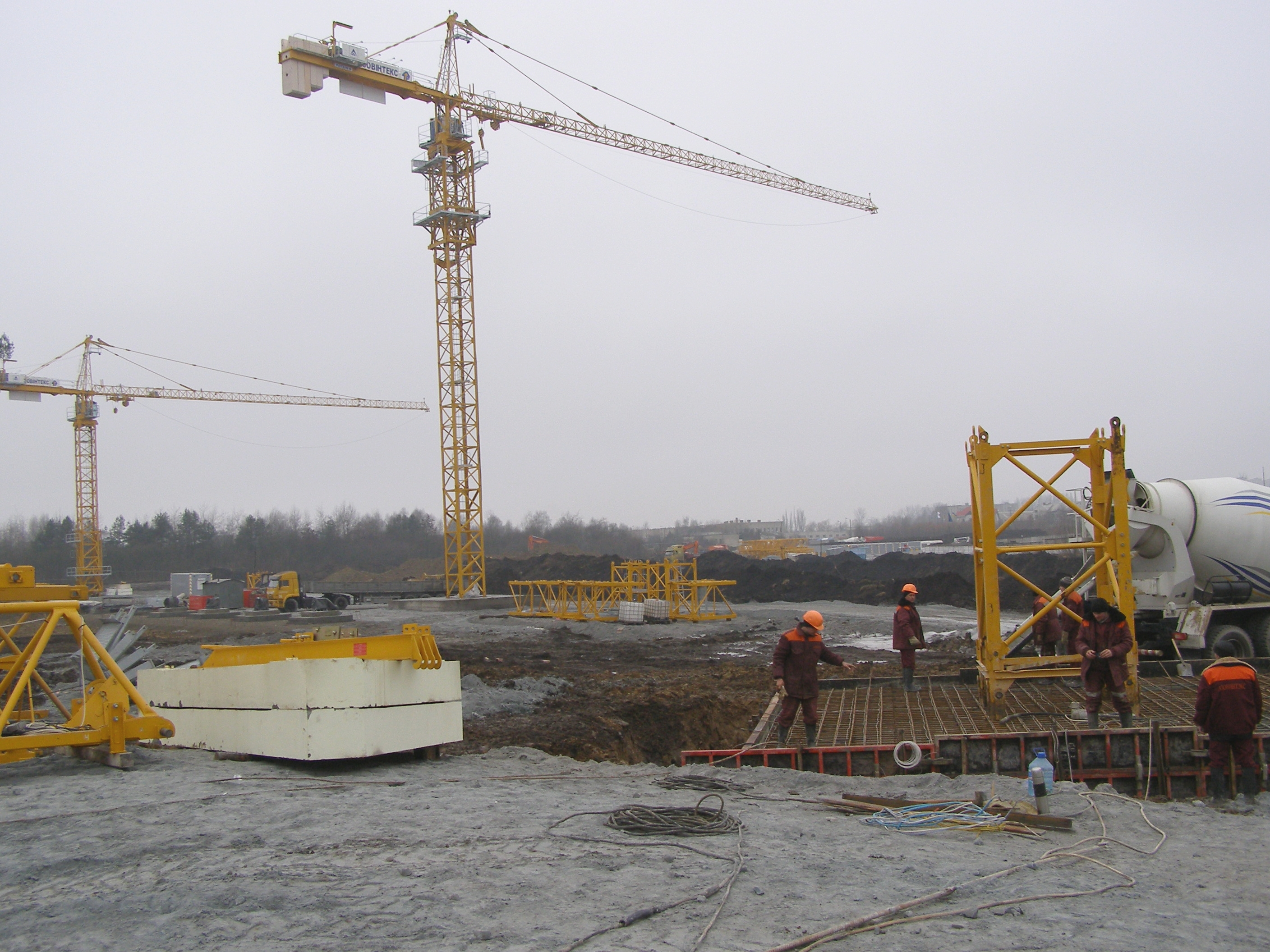
Cementing the foundation (winter of 2009)

The original architectural firm for the project was Hochtief Construction, which had completed the Dnipro Arena. They made a presentation of their design on 21 May 2007 and proposed the name of Lemberg. The capacity of the stadium was originally planned to be 32,000, at a total cost of 70.4 million euros. It was planned that the stadium would be erected prior to 2010. The Hochtief representatives met with Andriy Sadovy and Myroslav Senyk (the head of the local regional council). Lviv officials claimed that the arena would cost 60 million euros, with 75% of the amount to be paid by an investor and 25% by the city government. In early 2008, Hochtief was replaced by the Austrian company AlpineBau. After almost a year of discussions, no works had begun and by 10 October 2008 AlpineBau had rejected the city's bid of 85 million euros, requesting at least 100 million.

On 23 October 2008, Lviv's administration contacted ISD (Industrial Union of Donets Basin). ISD is a major transnational industrial corporation in Eastern Europe, combining several industries including mining, construction, metallurgy, machine-building, and others. As time was limited, municipal officials held talks with another Austrian architectural company, Albert Wimmer, which designed the Hypo-Arena in Klagenfurt. Together with another local company Arnika, they came up with the design for the Ukrainian stadium. On 7 November, the Ministry of Economics appointed the project-construction company Azovinteks as the general contractor which immediately sent about one hundred of its workers, along with equipment, to Lviv. Azovinteks is based in Mariupol and is part of the ISD group.

The website, turnir.com.ua, referencing the declaration of the Ukrainian Cabinet of Ministers said that in April 2010 the government of Ukraine transferred the stadium into the sphere of control of the Ministry of Sport, Family, and Youth in order to stabilize and accelerate the construction of the stadium. Previously, the stadium was the property of the Lviv communal venture "Directorate for construction of a stadium in Lviv".

On 23 June 2010, the deputy chairman of the Lviv Oblast State Administration (LODA) Volodymyr Hubytsky informed the members of Lviv's council that the financing of Euro-2012 in the city of Lviv had been increased by five billion hryvna (from 5.3 to 10.3 overall). Hubytsky also said the government had confirmed the State Aiming Program for the preparation of the final stage of Euro-2012. The Lviv Oblast was assigned up to 16.4 billion hryvnas to completely cover the construction of the stadium and the city's airport. The head of the oblast administration also stated that rates of construction were increased and by August 30 the stands' carrying structure for the second tier would be installed. Hubytsky said that a consensus was found with the state company "Lviv Armored-Tank maintenance plant" which agreed to surrender part of its territory for the construction of approachable road access and various engineer networks for the stadium.

Construction financing

The deputy chairman said that 345 million hryvnas were spent on all construction projects in 2010, which was one and a half times more than the previous couple of years (216 million). The state program estimated the financing of all Euro-2012-related projects at 5.7 billion hryvnas, out of which 4 billion would come from the state budget, 1.35 from investors, and the rest .36 billion from the local budget. For the stadium only, the program assigned some 1.65 billion hryvnas, out of which .31 billion (.23 - state, .08 - Lviv) were released at the start of construction and 180 billion in 2010.

== Plans ==

The stadium's capacity is anticipated to be 34,915 spectators including 450 VIP sittings as well. All seats will be covered, while part of the roof assembly will be transparent to provide sufficient sunlight for the turf. The stadium's parking will be located underneath the arena which will consist of three levels. The parking for VIP will include 1,593 spaces. Parking for tele- and radio-media agencies will include (6,000 square metres (65,000 sq ft)). There also will be parking for the disabled and special elevators will provide passage to seats that are also designed and reserved to accustom the necessary personnel.

The western portion of the stadium 215.7 metres (708 ft) long will include:

- concert-halls,
- VIP clubs and restaurants (1,260 square metres (13,600 sq ft))
- media-center (640 square metres (6,900 sq ft))
- various training centers (280 square metres (3,000 sq ft))
- administration offices (780 square metres (8,400 sq ft))
- offices with a restaurant (1,050 square metres (11,300 sq ft))

== Location and transportation ==
Location of the stadium pointed by the blue arrow.

Roads

The stadium is located in the southern part of Lviv city, near the intersection of the city's beltway (Ukrainian: Кільцева дорога) M10/M06 and the route E471/M06 (locally, Stryiska Street). Note that the city's beltway is part of the route E40 that connects Dresden, Wrocław, Rzeszów, Lviv, Kyiv, and Kharkiv. The location of the stadium is part of the Sykhivskyi District of Lviv, while the stadium is situated right next to the Sykhiv residential massif. The stadium is located next to a hippodrome.

Airport

The easiest access to the Lviv International Airport is by the beltway and the route M11. The airport lies northwest from the stadium.

Metro/trams

The city of Lviv is famous for its trams network. Since Ukraine won the bid for the Euro-2012 there were discussions on extending the network to the southern edge of the city under the name Trams to Sykhiv, as well as revival of the idea of a local subway system. Neither went forward due to "money vacuuming" out of the local budget. On 1 December 2009, the city of Lviv opened a line of a railbus that ran from Sykhiv to Pidzamche stopping at the Lviv Rail Terminal as well. However, on 15 June 2010, the line was closed down due to being unprofitable.

== Other stadiums in Lviv ==
There are two other major stadiums in the city. One of them is the Ukraina Stadium which is leased to FC Karpaty Lviv until 2018. Ukraina Stadium is also one of the main alternative stadiums of the Ukraine national football team. Another major stadium in Lviv is the SKA Stadium. Both Ukraina and SKA are located in much closer proximity to the centre of Lviv than Arena Lviv.

== UEFA Euro 2012 matches ==
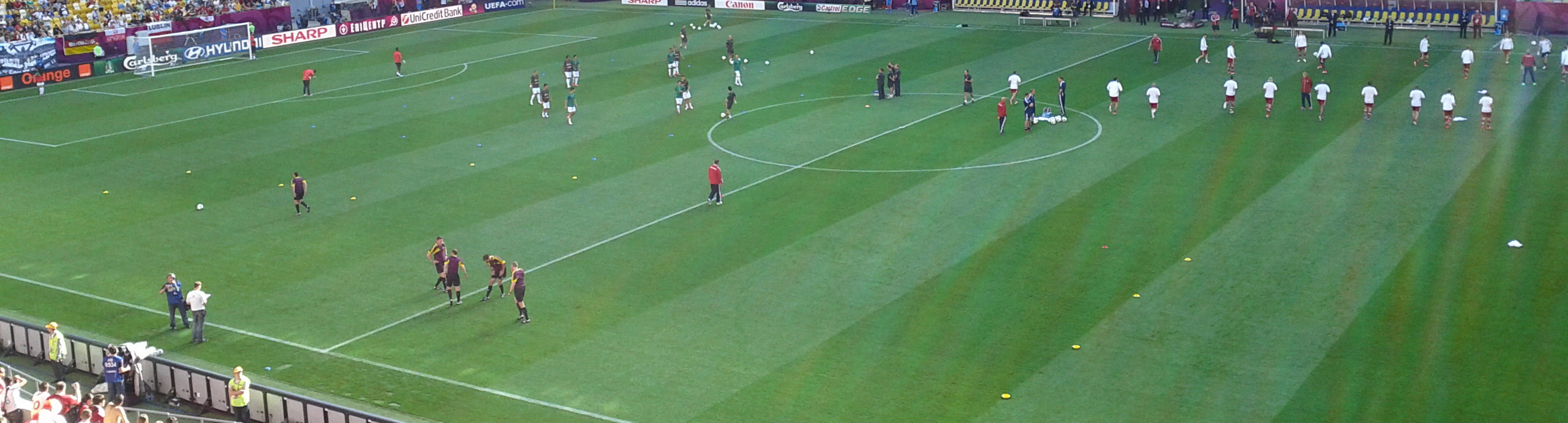
Warm up before the Euro 2012 game Denmark-Portugal

The stadium was one of the venues for the UEFA Euro 2012. Three group B matches were played there (with the other matches in that group played at Metalist Stadium, Kharkiv).

The following matches were played at the stadium during the UEFA Euro 2012:

Date	Time (CEST / EEST)	Team #1	Res.	Team #2	Round	Scored
9 June 2012	20:45 / 21:45	Germany	1–0	Portugal	Group B	Mario Gómez 72'
13 June 2012	18:00 / 19:00	Denmark	2–3	Portugal	Group B	Pepe 24'; Postiga 36'; Bendtner 41', 80'; Varela 87'
17 June 2012	20:45 / 21:45	Denmark	1–2	Germany	Group B	Podolski 19'; Krohn-Dehli 24'; Bender 80'

== 2018 World Cup qualifications disqualification ==
On 27 September 2013, FIFA Disciplinary Committee adopted a decision about disqualification of the stadium starting from 27 September 2013 and throughout the whole period of preliminary qualification for the 2018 FIFA World Cup.

== Ukrainian Cup Final ==
Year	Dates & Times	Team #1	Result	Team #2	Attendance	Source
2025–26; Final	20 May 2026 - 18:00 (EEST)	Chernihiv	1 – 3	Dynamo Kyiv	4,889	
2015–16; Final	21 May 2016 - 17:00 (EEST)	Shakhtar Donetsk; Oleksandr Hladkyy 42', 57'	2 – 0 (1 – 0)	Zorya Luhansk	21,720	

== Gallery ==
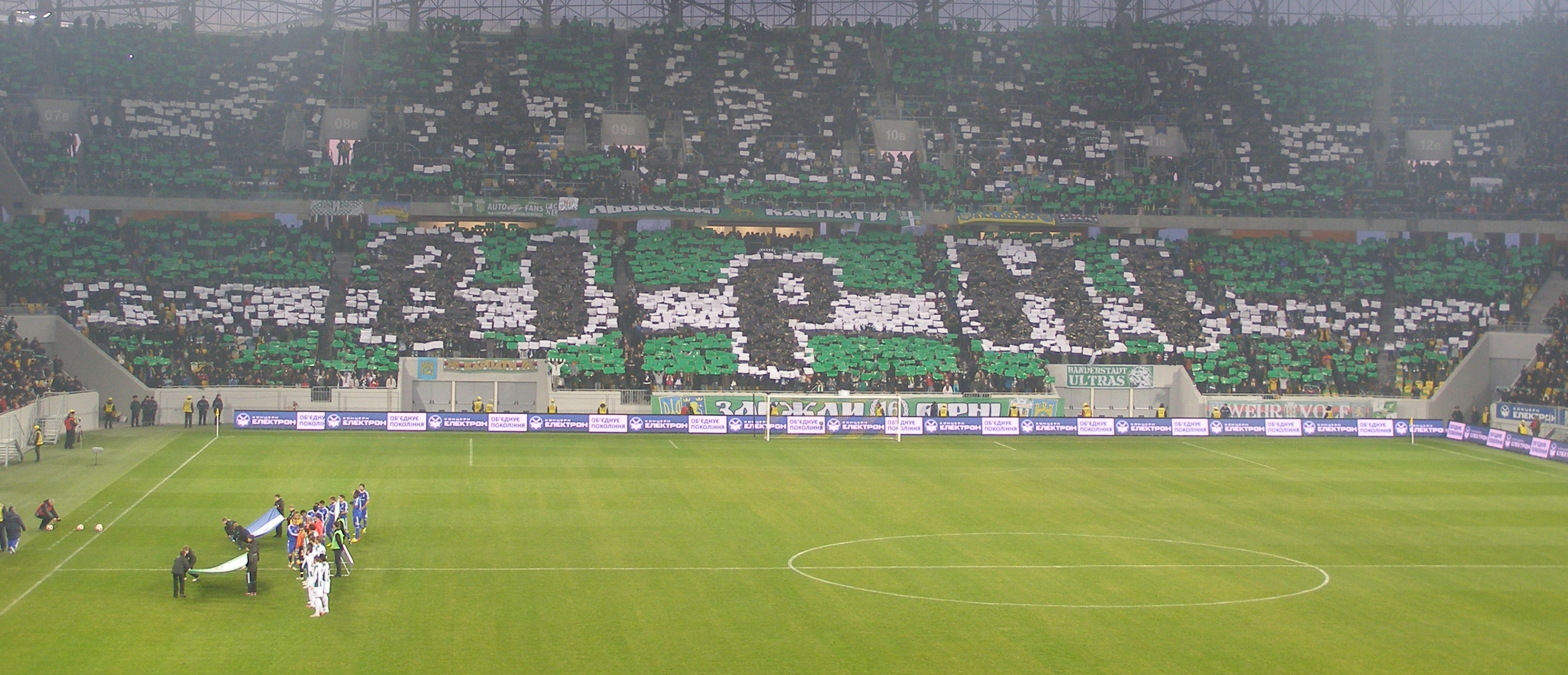
Fans of Karpaty Lviv: "Always Loyal"

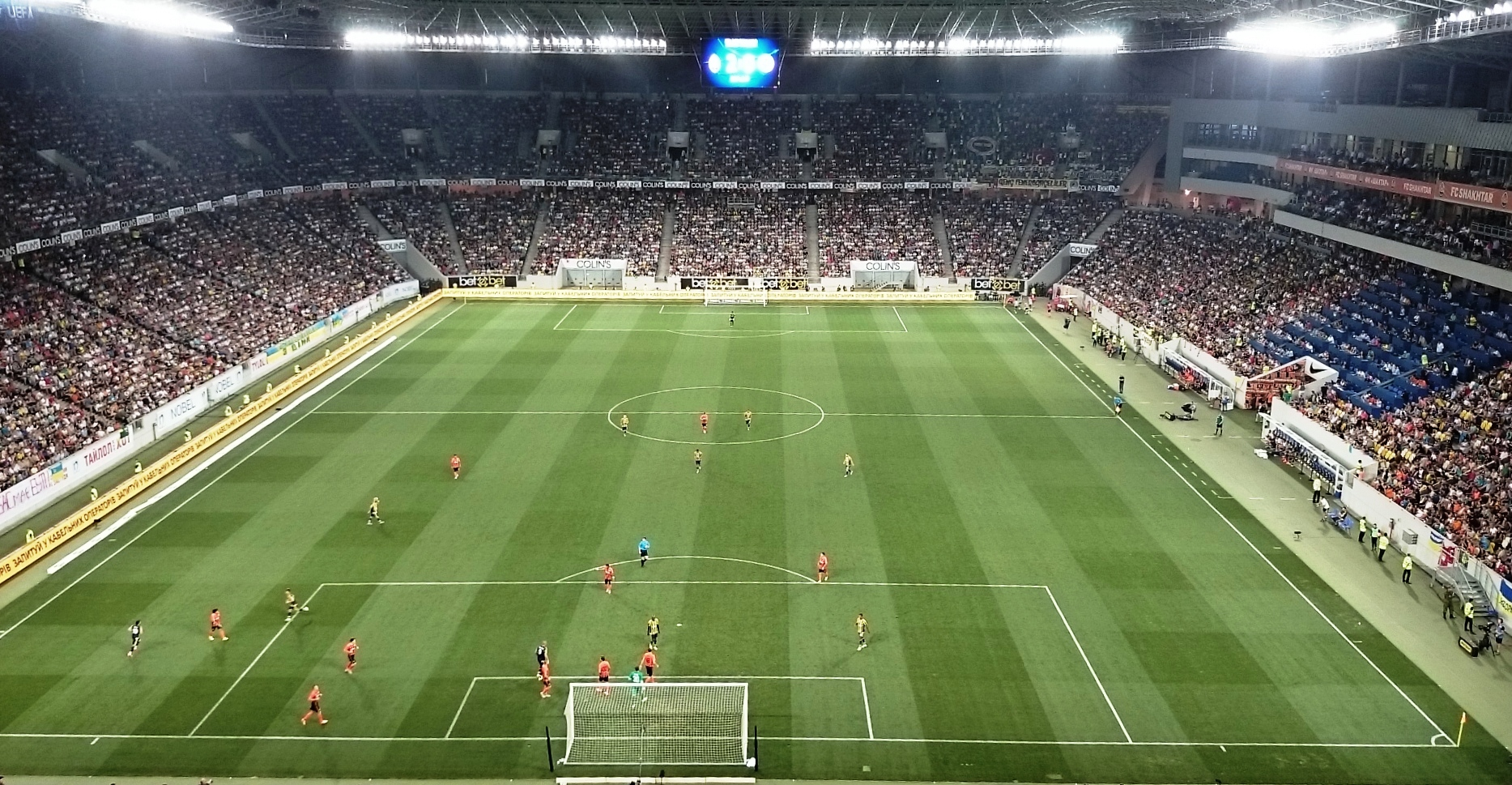
2015 match

== See also ==
- Lviv Danylo Halytskyi International Airport
