= P04 road (Ukraine) =

Road of regional significance in Ukraine

Road P04 (Ukraine)
Length	Common — 212,6 km
Covered regions	Kyiv Oblast, Cherkasy Oblast
Map
Route
Kyiv	M 01 E95 • M 03 E40 • M 05 E95 • M 06 E40 • M 07 E373 • E101 • H 01 • H 07 • P01 • P02 • P03
Fastiv	P19
Bila Tserkva	M 05 E95 • P17 • P32
Zvenyhorodka	P19

P04 road is a state regional road in Ukraine connecting the capital of Ukraine, Kyiv and town Zvenyhorodka in Cherkasy Oblast. It is 212.6 km (132.1 mi) long. The route starts in Kyiv, goes through Fastiv, Bila Tserkva, Tarashcha and ends in Zvenyhorodka.

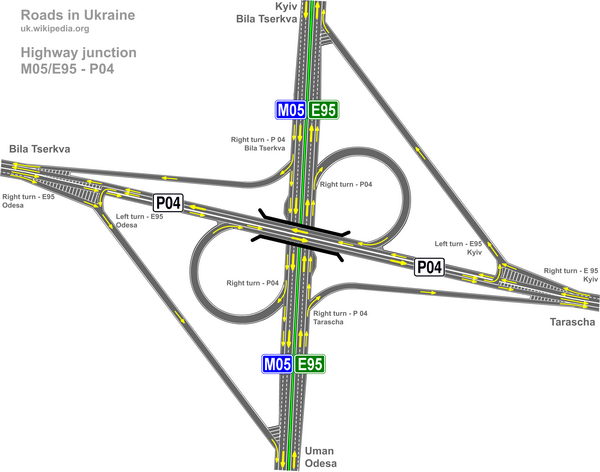
Highway junction M 05 E95 — P04 near Bila Tserkva.

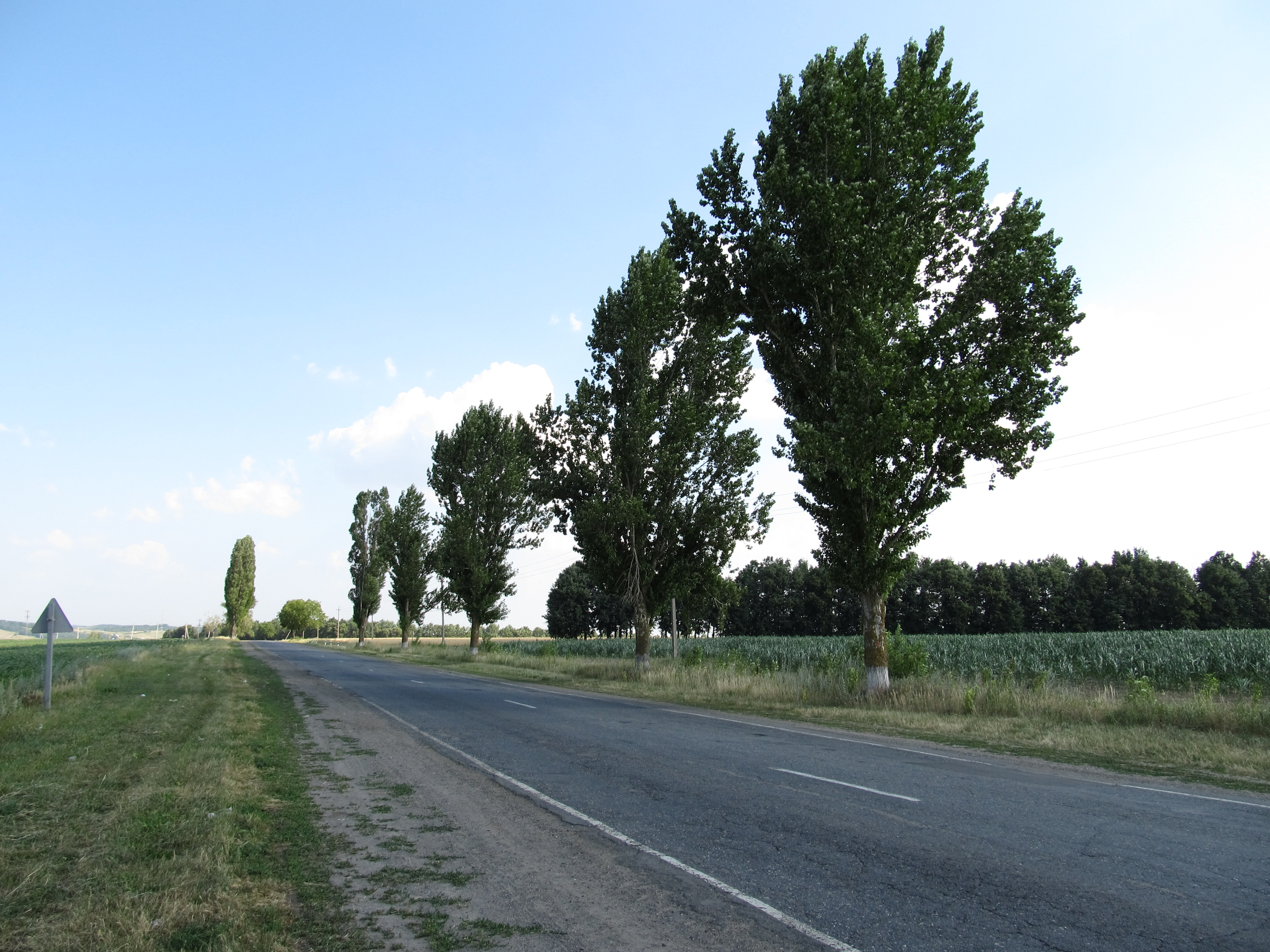
P04 near Nemorozh

== See also ==
- Roads in Ukraine
- Ukraine Highways
