= P14 road (Ukraine) =

Road in Ukraine

Road P14
- Автошлях Р14

Route information
- Length: 154.4 km (95.9 mi)

Major junctions
- south end: H 22 in Lutsk
- north end: Belarusian border at Dolsk

Location
- Country: Ukraine
- Oblasts: Volyn

Highway system
- Roads in Ukraine; State Highways
← P 11	→ P 15

P14 is a regional road (P-Highway) in Volyn Oblast, Ukraine. It runs north-south and connects Lutsk with the Belarus-Ukraine border.

== Main route ==
Main route and connections to/intersections with other highways in Ukraine.

Marker	Main settlements	Notes	Highway Interchanges
Volyn Oblast
0 km	Dolsk		Belarus-Ukraine border
	Liubeshiv		T0308
	Uhrynychi		T0311
	Manevychi		
	Okonsk		E373 M 07
	Kolky		T1802
	Omelne		T0312
	Kivertsi		T0309
	Prylutske		E85 M 19
154.4 km	Lutsk		Kivertsivska vulytsia (transition) • H 22

== See also ==
- Roads in Ukraine
