= Highway H17 (Ukraine) =

Highway in Ukraine

Highway H17
- Автошлях Н17
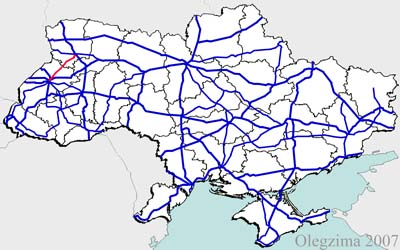

Route information
- Length: 130.5 km (81.1 mi)

Major junctions
- Northeast end: M 19 in Lutsk
- Southwest end: M 06 in Lviv

Location
- Country: Ukraine
- Oblasts: Volyn, Lviv

Highway system
- Roads in Ukraine; State Highways
← H 16	→ H 18

Highway H17 is a Ukrainian national highway (H-highway) connecting the city of Lviv with Lutsk.

== Main route ==
Main route and connections to/intersections with other highways in Ukraine.

Marker	Main settlements	Notes	Highway interchanges
Volyn Oblast
0 km	Lutsk		E85 M 19 • H 22 • P14
	Horokhiv		
Lviv Oblast
	Radekhiv		
	Kamianka-Buzka		
	Mali Pidlisky		M 06 (merges) E40
130.5 km	Hamaliyivka		M 06 (splits) E40

== See also ==
- Roads in Ukraine
- Ukraine highways
- International E-road network
- Pan-European corridors
