= Highway M06 (Ukraine) =

Highway in Ukraine

Highway M06
- Автошлях М06
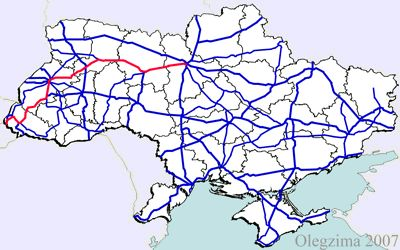

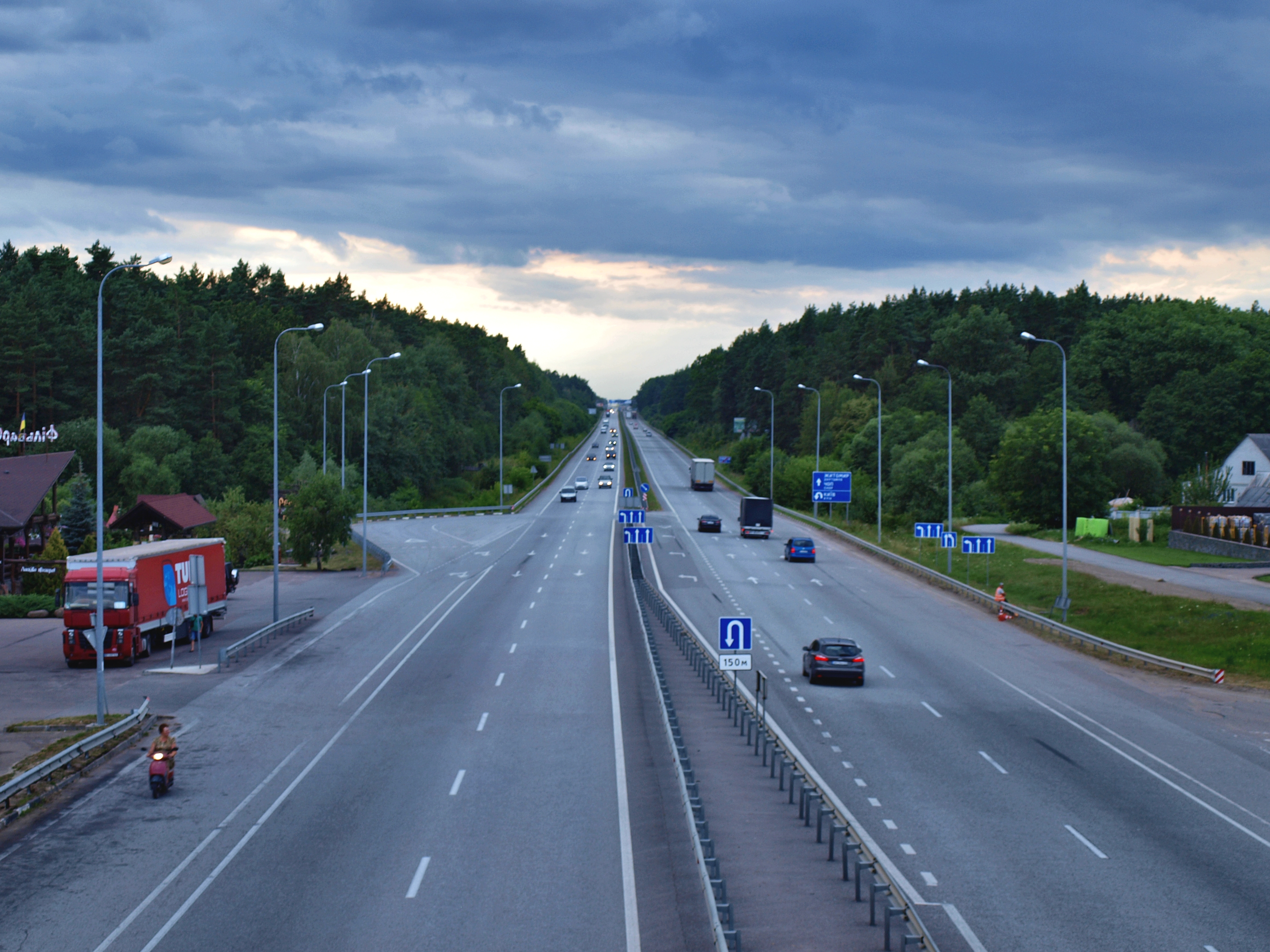
- M06 road in Zhytomyr Oblast

Route information
- Part of E40 / E50 / E471 / E573
- Length: 821.5 km (510.5 mi) 846.2 km (525.8 mi) with city routes

Major junctions
- East end: M 03 in Kyiv
- West end: Hungarian border near Chop

Location
- Country: Ukraine
- Oblasts: Kyiv, Kyiv, Zhytomyr, Rivne, Lviv, Zakarpattia

Highway system
- Roads in Ukraine; State Highways
← M 05	→ M 07

Highway M06 (Ukrainian: Автошлях М06) is a Ukrainian international highway (M-highway) connecting Kyiv to the Hungarian border near Chop, where it continues as Hungarian main road 4 to Záhony and Budapest.

== General overview ==
The M06 is a major transnational corridor and along with the M03 combines into European route E40. The highway is also part of the Pan-European Transportation corridors III and V as well as the "Europe-Asia" Transportation corridor. It is the second longest route spanning over 800 kilometres (500 mi) (see Roads in Ukraine). The M06 connects four major European routes: E40, E50, E85, and E95.

== History ==
The route from Lemberg via Stryj to the then Austro-Hungarian border belonged until 1918 to the Austrian crown land of Galicia and was called the Stryjer Reichsstraße.

=== Description ===
From Kyiv to Lviv the M06 is part of European route E40, European route E471 from Lviv to Mukachevo, European route E50 from Stryi (Lviv Region) to Uzhhorod, and European route E573 from Uzhhorod to the Hungarian border.

From Kyiv to Rivne, the road features 2 lanes in both directions with physical separation, with the exception of Zhytomyr bypass. From Rivne on, the road is mostly a single carriageway, though some dual carriageway sections exist.

During May 2022, several segments of this road were closed due to 2022 Russian invasion of Ukraine. Until 1 April, several civilians have been killed while they were trying to leave Kyiv.

== Main route ==
Main route and connections to/intersections with other highways in Ukraine.

The route starts at the intersection of the Kyiv's beltway and Victory Parkway (Prospekt Peremohy), for which it serves as an extension.

Marker	Main settlements	Notes	Highway Interchanges
0 km	Kyiv		E95/ E101 ( M 01 - M 05) • E373 M 07 • E40 T-10-27 M 03 • H 01 • H 07
103 km	Korostyshiv	Bypass 17 km (11 mi)	
128 km	Zhytomyr	Bypass 25 km (16 mi)	E583 M 21 • H 03
220 km	Zviahel	Bypass 15 km (9.3 mi)	
258 km	Korets	Bypass 9 km (5.6 mi)	
322 km	Rivne	Bypass 18 km (11 mi)	H 22
374 km	Dubno		E85 M 19
441 km	Brody		
530 km	Lviv	Bypass 24 km (15 mi)	E40 M 10 (alt. M 11) • E372 M 09^{[a]} • E471 • H 17 • H 02 (Vynnyky) • H 09
612 km	Stryi		E50 M 30 • H 10
651 km	Skole		
744 km	Svaliava		
770 km	Mukachevo		H 09
	Uzhhorod		E50 M 08
821 km	Chop / Border (Hungary)		(Hungary) 4 E573

Notes

^a). M 06 intersects M 09 on its city's northern access route away from the main branch.

== Access routes ==
The highway passes the following cities going around them, however it has spurred away access routes towards them.

- Zhytomyr 10 km (6.2 mi)
- Zviahel 5.6 km (3.5 mi)
- Lviv 5.7 km (3.5 mi)
- Rivne 3.4 km (2.1 mi)

== Gallery ==
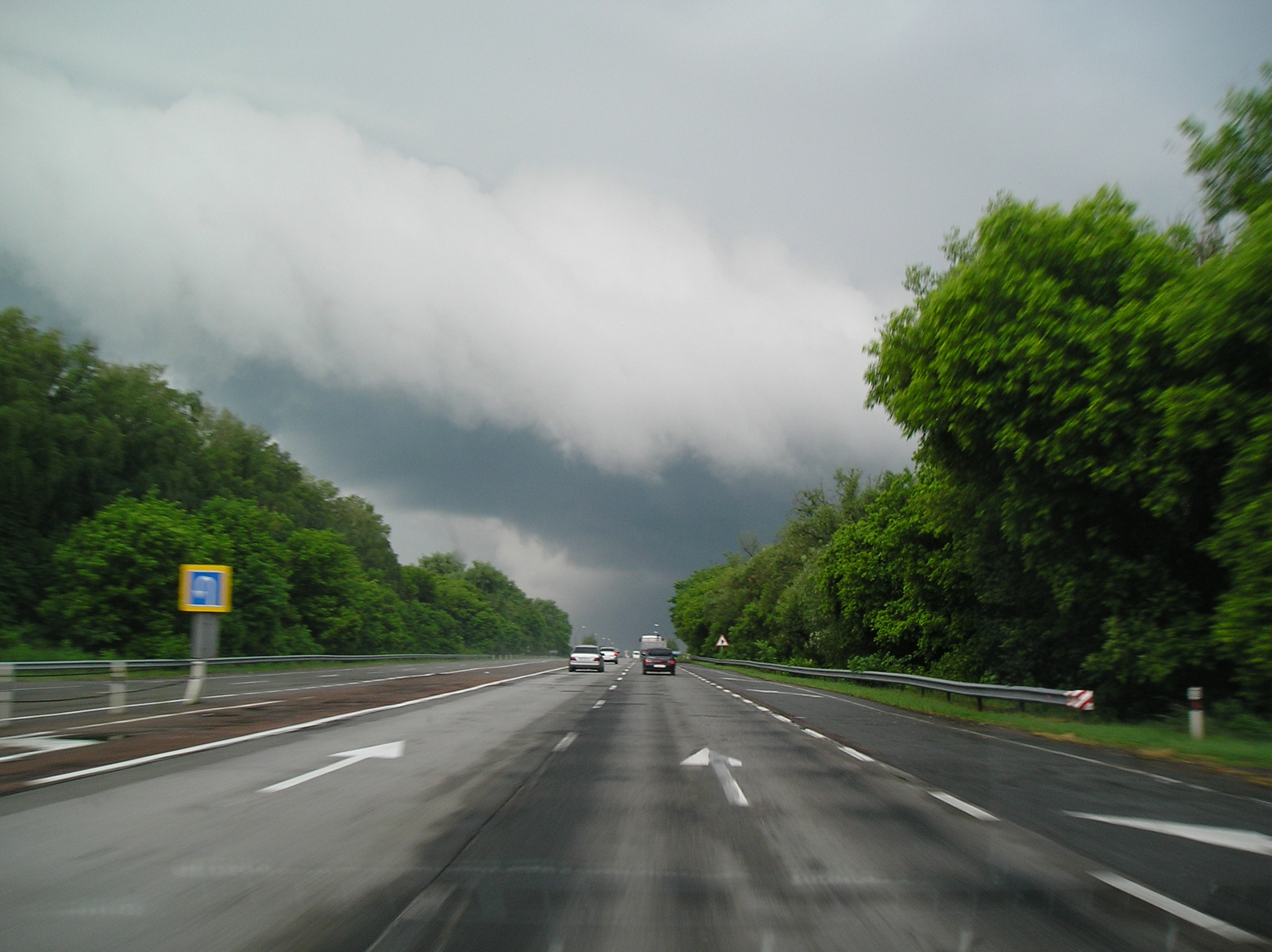
Highway exiting Kyiv in the direction of Zhytomyr

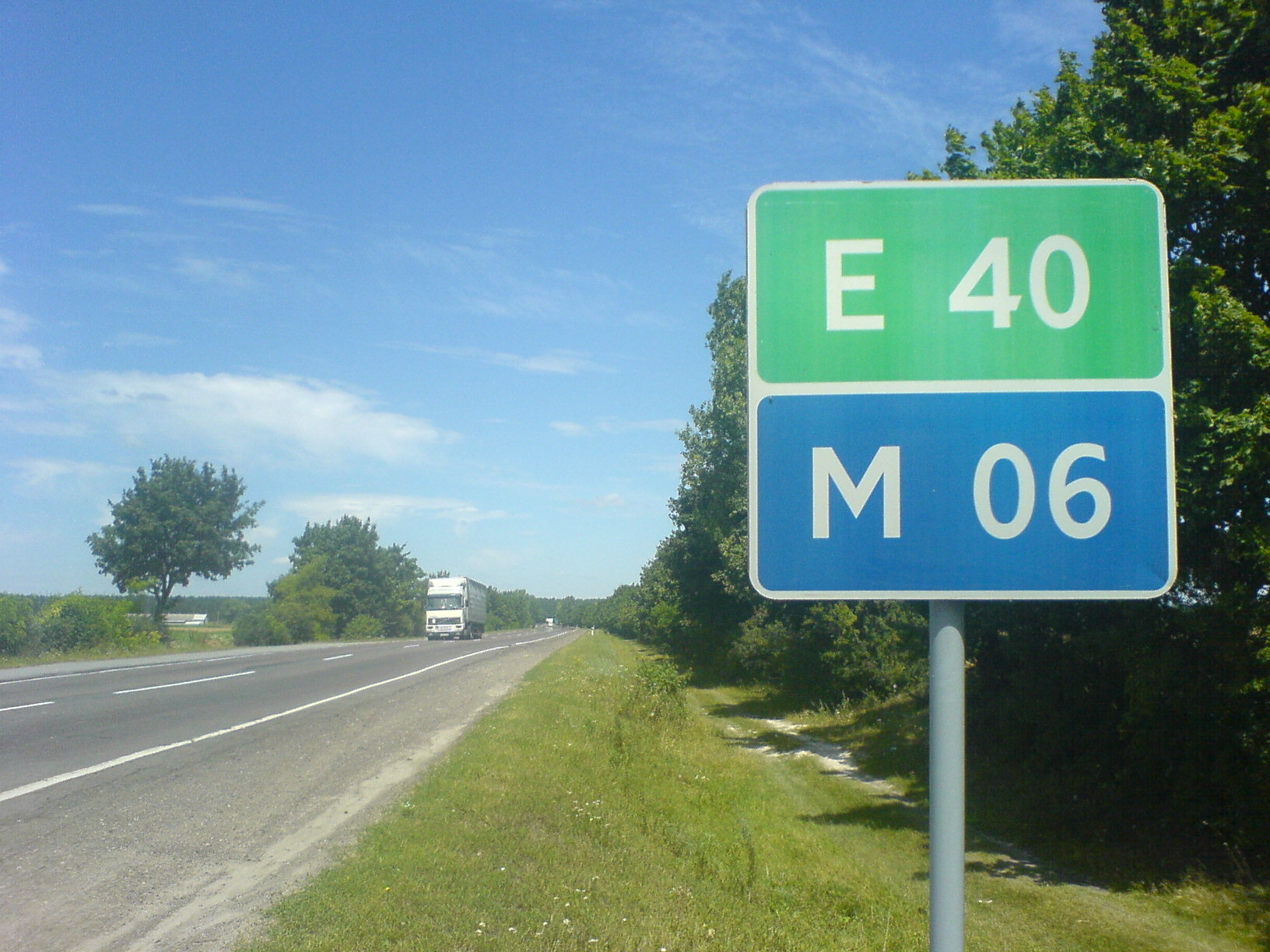
M06/E40 road shield near Brody

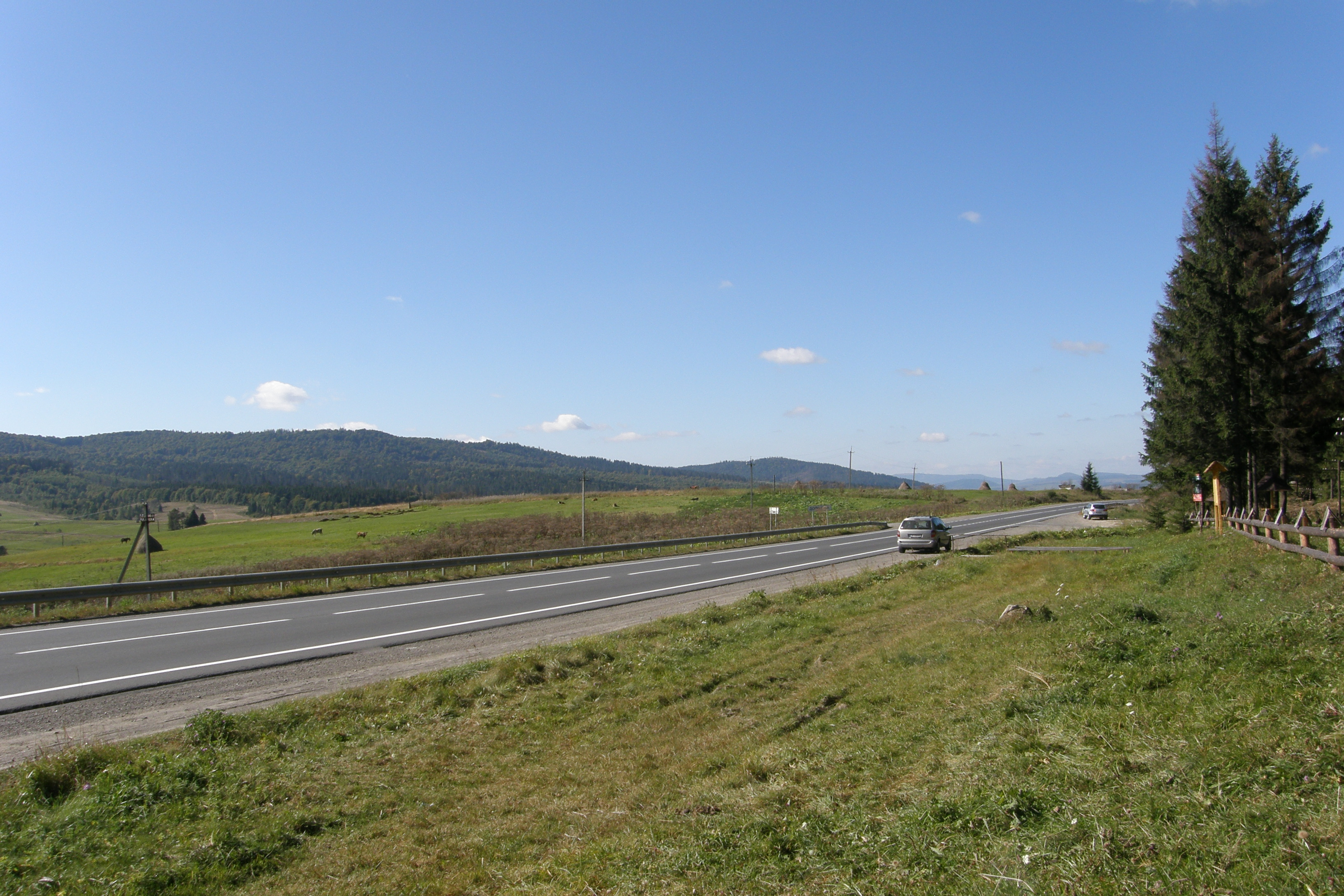
M06 Highway in Ukrainian Carpathians

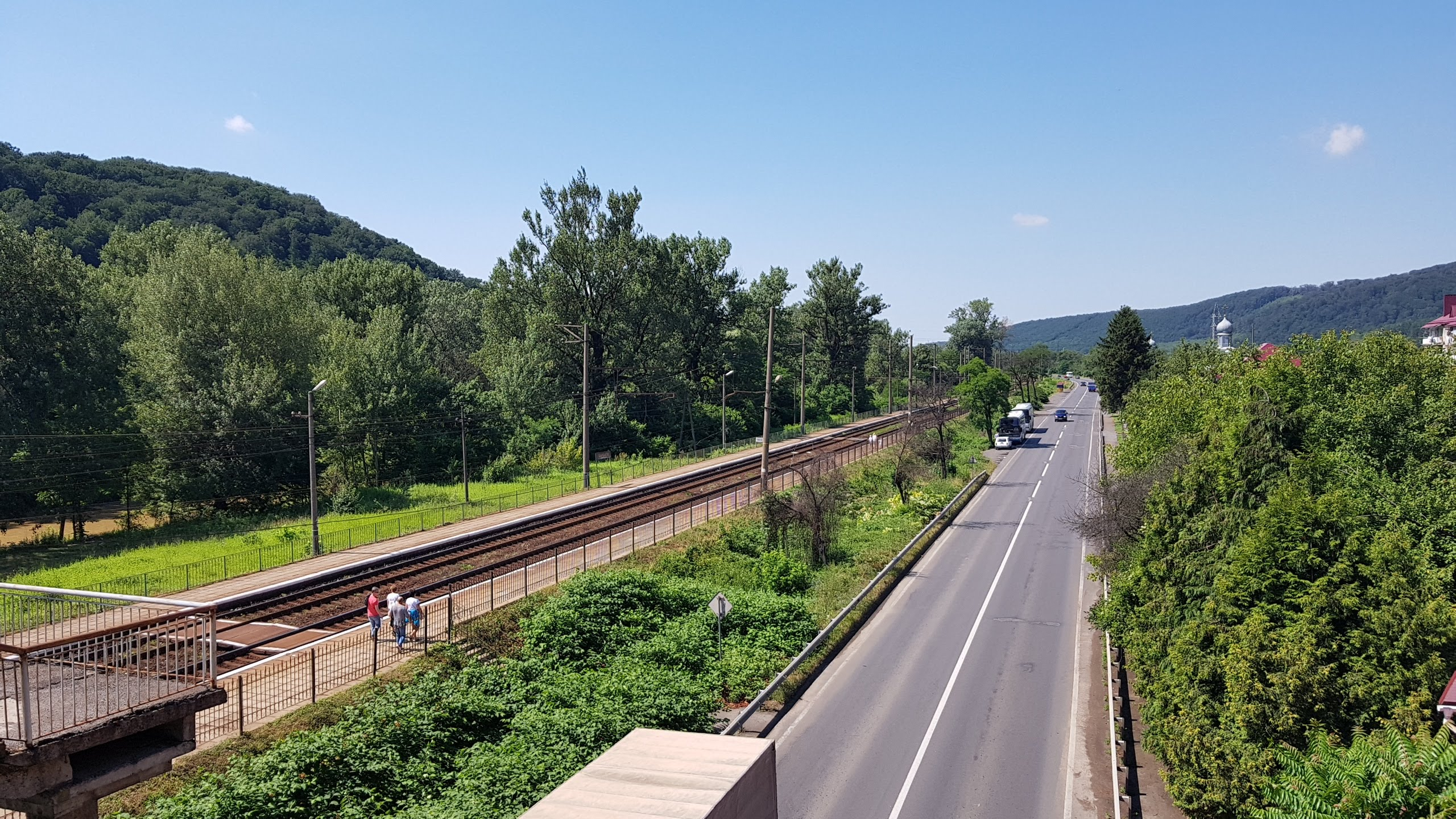
The road in Zakarpattia Oblast

== See also ==
- Roads in Ukraine
- Ukraine Highways
- International E-road network
- Pan-European corridors
