= Highway M11 (Ukraine) =

Highway in Ukraine

Highway M11
- Автошлях М11
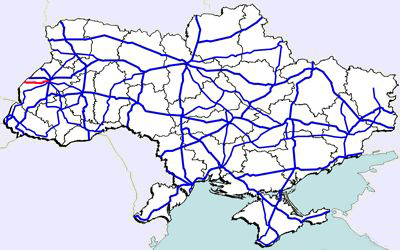

Route information
- Length: 71.6 km (44.5 mi)

Major junctions
- East end: M 06/ M 09/ M 10/ H 02/ H 09 in Lviv
- West end: Polish border at Shehyni

Location
- Country: Ukraine
- Oblasts: Lviv

Highway system
- Roads in Ukraine; State Highways

Highway M11 is a Ukraine international highway (M-highway) connecting Lviv with Przemyśl across the Polish - Ukrainian border, where it continues into Poland as National Road 28 (DK 28).

The route serves as an alternative to the M10.

== Route ==
Highway M11
Marker	Main settlements	Notes	Highway Interchanges
0 km	Lviv		E40/ E471( M 06 - M 10) • E372 M 09 • H 02 • H 09
1.5 km	Rudne		H 13
20 km	Horodok		
40 km	Sudova Vyshnia		P 40
58.5 km	Mostyska		
71.6 km	Shehyni / Border (Poland)		28 (Poland)

== See also ==
- International E-road network
- Pan-European corridors
