= P15 =

P15 may refer to:

- Aviatik P.15, a German reconnaissance biplane
- CDKN2B, a human protein
- Lippisch P.15, a German prototype aircraft
- MAB PA-15 pistol
- Nissan Kicks (P15), a SUV
- P-15 radar, a Soviet radar system
- P15 road (Ukraine)
- P-15 Termit, a Soviet missile
- Papyrus 15, a biblical manuscript
- Pseudomonas sRNA P15
- WarFairy P-15, a firearm stock
- Boeing XP-15, an American prototype fighter aircraft

== See also ==
- 15P (disambiguation)
