= Reichsstraße =

Reichsstraße (German, 'imperial road') may refer to:

- Imperial road, designated routes in the Holy Roman Empire
- Reichsstraße (Austria), official designation 1804–1918 of trunk roads in Old Austria
- Reichsstraße (Deutsches Reich), introduced in 1934 in Nazi Germany in place of Fernverkehrsstraße

== See also ==
- Street name
- Reichsautobahn
- Swedish national road
