= Highway M10 (Ukraine) =

Highway in Ukraine

Highway M10
- Автошлях М10
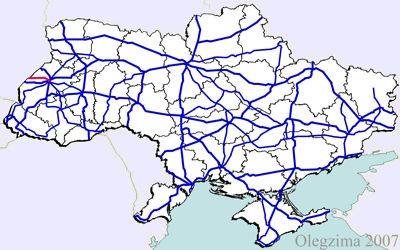

Route information
- Part of E40
- Length: 65.1 km (40.5 mi) With additional roads: 77.3 km (48.0 mi)

Major junctions
- East end: M 06/ M 09/ M 11/ H 02/ H 09 in Lviv
- West end: Polish border at Krakovets

Location
- Country: Ukraine
- Oblasts: Lviv

Highway system
- Roads in Ukraine; State Highways
← M 09	→ M 11

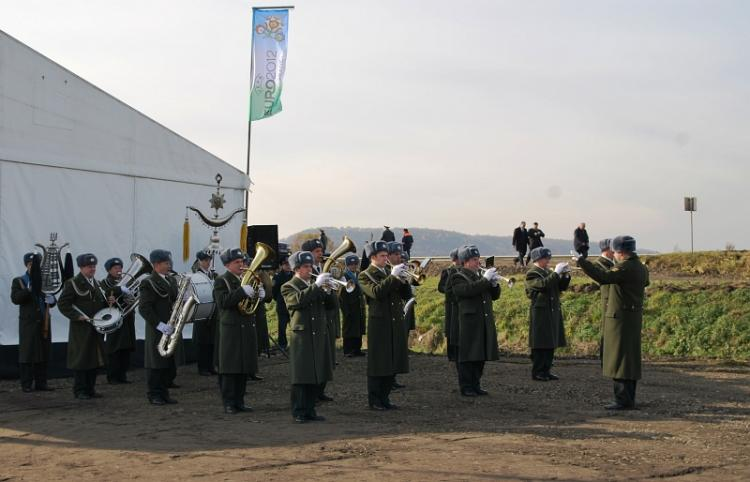
Performance of military band during the official motorway foundation-stone laying ceremony

Highway M10 is a Ukrainian international highway (M-highway) connecting Lviv to Krakovets on the border with Poland, where it continues as the A4 motorway.

There are plans to build a motorway along this route in the coming years. This was supposed to be done by a private investor but for the last 10 years these efforts did not succeed. Now the government of Ukraine will try to find the funding.

== Route ==
Marker	Main settlements	Notes	Highway Interchanges
0 km	Lviv		E40/ E471 M 06 • E372 M 09 • M 11 • H 02 • H 09
24 km	Ivano-Frankove		
32 km	Novoiavorivsk		
50 km	Yavoriv		
62 km	Krakovets / Border (Poland)		E40 A4 (Poland)

== See also ==
- Roads in Ukraine
- Ukraine Highways
- International E-road network
- Pan-European corridors
