= 15P =

15P may refer to:

- 15P/Finlay, a comet
- SpaceShipOne flight 15P, a commercial spaceflight
- Phosphorus (_{15}P), a chemical element

== See also ==
- P15 (disambiguation)
