= P78 road (Ukraine) =

Road in Ukraine

Road P78
- Автошлях Р78

Route information
- Length: 134.2 km (83.4 mi)

Major junctions
- northwest end: Kharkiv
- southeast end: Horokhovatka

Location
- Country: Ukraine
- Oblasts: Kharkiv

Highway system
- Roads in Ukraine; State Highways
← P 38	→ P 40

P78 is a regional road (P-Highway) in Kharkiv Oblast, Ukraine. It runs northwest–southeast and connects Kharkiv with Horokhovatka. The road runs somewhat parallel to the highway M03 between Kharkiv and Izium. Among notable landmarks, there is Zmiiv thermal power station. The road passes such cities like Zmiiv, Slobozhanske, Balakliya, and crosses river Siversky Donets.

In 2019, road rehabilitation works continued on the highway.

== See also ==
- Roads in Ukraine
