= Highway M09 (Ukraine) =

Highway in Ukraine

Highway M09
- Автошлях М09
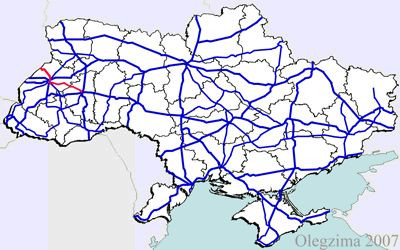

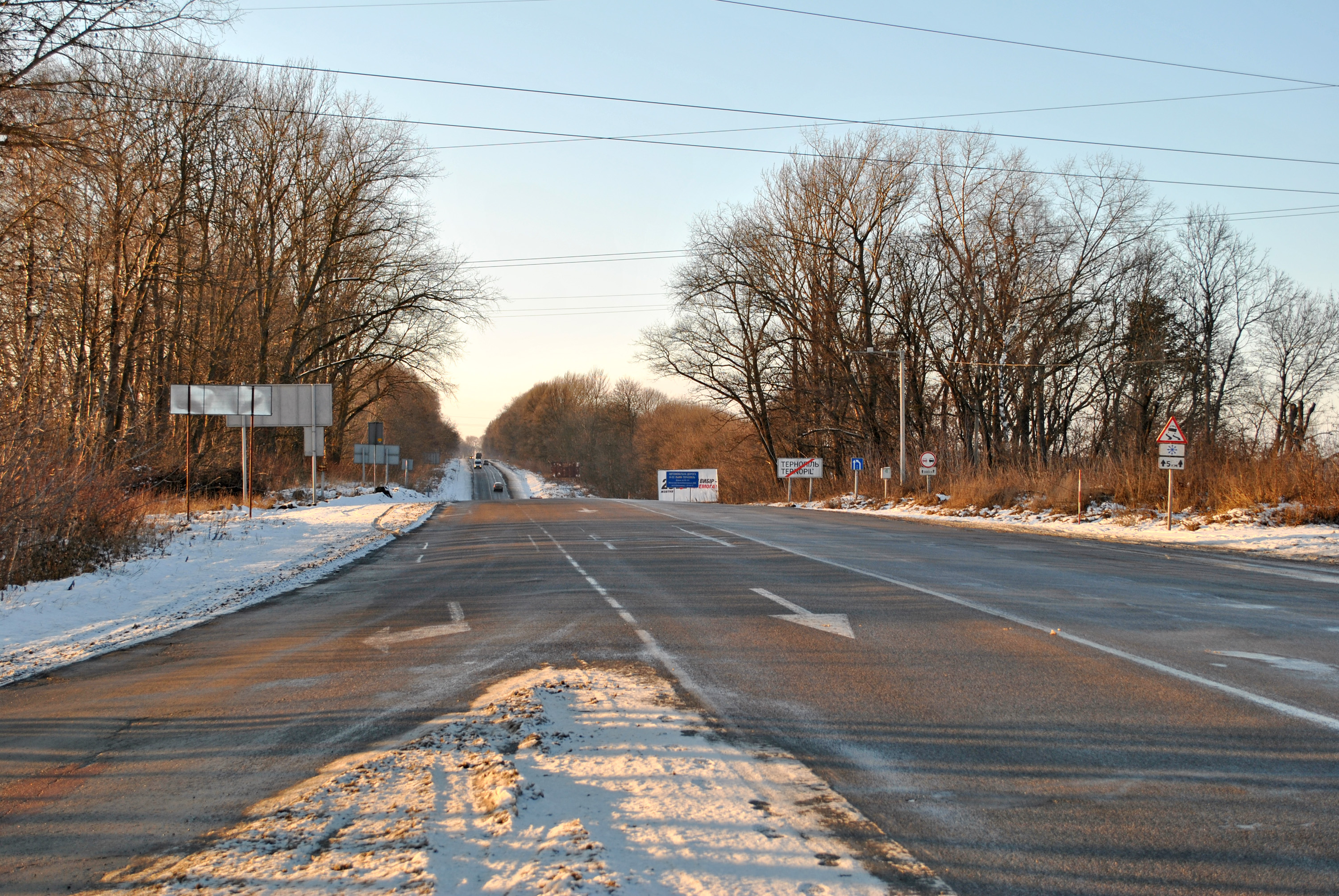

Route information
- Part of E372
- Length: 174 km (108 mi)

Major junctions
- East end: M 30 in Ternopil
- West end: Polish border at Rava-Ruska checkpoint

Location
- Country: Ukraine
- Oblasts: Ternopil, Lviv

Highway system
- Roads in Ukraine; State Highways
← M 08	→ M 10

Highway M09 is a Ukrainian international highway (M-highway) which is part of the Warsaw - Lviv route. It starts as a split-off from the M30 near Ternopil, runs through Lviv, then turns north and heads towards the border with Poland. The highway terminates at the border checkpoint Rava-Ruska. Across the Polish border it continues as National Road 17 (DK17). The section between Rava-Ruska and Lviv is part of European route E372.

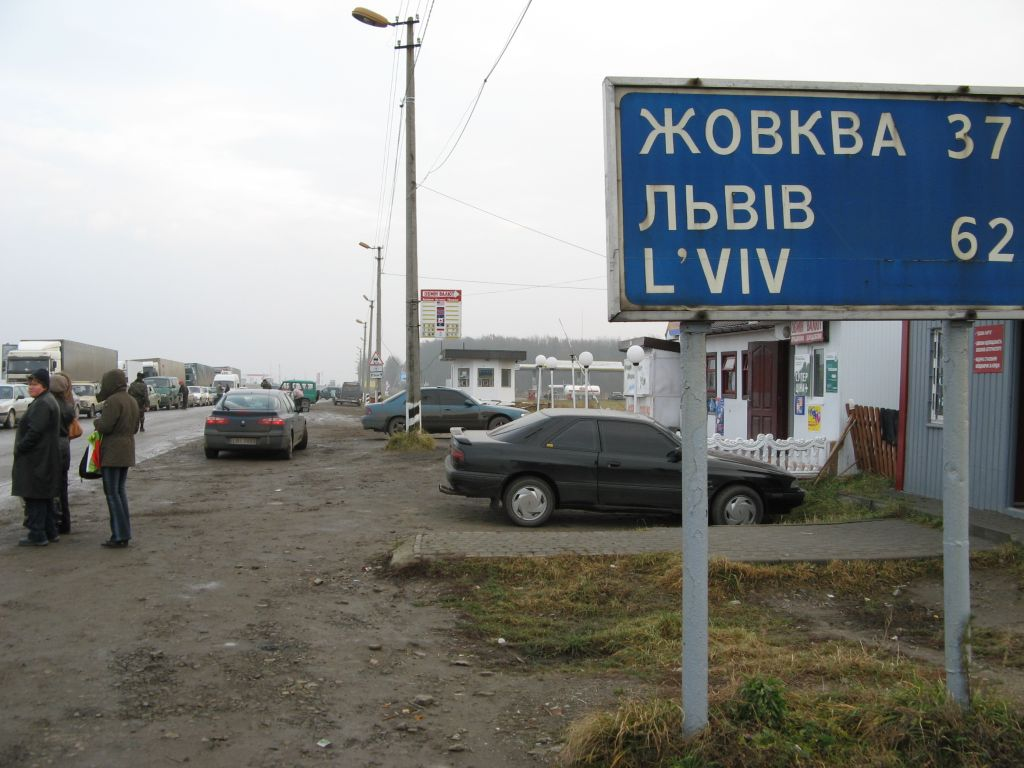
Road sign on the M09 near Rava-Rus'ka

== History ==
This route belonged until 1918 to the Austrian crown land of Galicia and its section between Lviv and Rava was called the Żółkiewer Reichsstraße.

== Route ==
Highway M09
Marker	Main settlements	Notes	Highway Interchanges
Ternopil Oblast
0 km	Arboretum "Karpaty"	starts at "Berezhanska konyushyna"	M 30
	Chahari Kutkivetski Botanic Reserve		P 41
	Zboriv		T2014 • T2013
Lviv Oblast
	Zolochiv • Yasenivtsi		T1413
	Yaktoriv		T1806
	Pidhaichyky • Kurovychi		T1417
	Kurovychi		T1425
111.9 km	Vynnyky		
112 km	Lviv	Bypass	M 06
	Zhovkva	Bypass	
174 km	Rava-Ruska / Border (Poland)		E37217 (Poland)

== See also ==
- Roads in Ukraine
- Ukraine Highways
- International E-road network
- Pan-European corridors
