= Reichsstraße (Austria) =

A Reichsstraße (literally "imperial road") was the official designation from 1804 to 1918 of trunk roads in Old Austria maintained by the (from 1867 Cisleithanian) State (k.k. Ministry) – in contrast to the state roads (Landesstraße) maintained by the individual crown lands and the municipal roads (Gemeindestraßen) maintained by the parishes or municipalities (Gemeinden).

== Lower Austria and Vienna ==
The following Reichsstraßen, amongst others, emanated from the capital, Vienna:

- Reichsstraße to Budapest (within Vienna known as the Simmeringer Hauptstraße since 1894, outside the city known as the Bundesstraße 10 today, then the 50 to the Hungarian border near Nickelsdorf, Burgenland / Hegyeshalom)
- Brünner Reichsstraße (known as the Brünner Straße today and the Bundesstraße 7 to Nikolsburg in Moravia)
- Kagraner Reichsstraße or Wiener Reichsstraße (alternative route to Brünn, known today in Vienna as the Wagramer Straße, outside the city known as the Bundesstraße 8, then 49 to Lundenburg in Moravia); to get from the city centre to the Kagraner Reichsstraße, the Kronprinz Rudolf Bridge or Reichsstraßen Bridge over the Danube has to be crossed. Its short name, Reichsbrücke, (Reich Bridge) is still used today.
- Pragueer Reichsstraße (known today as the Prager Straße and Bundesstraße 3, then the 4 and 2 as far as the Czech border near Gmünd (Lower Austria))
- Preßburger Reichsstraße (known today as the Pressburger Straße and Bundesstraße 9 to Hainburg)
- Triester Reichsstraße (known today as the Triester Straße and Bundesstraße 17 to Semmering)

== Upper Austria ==
In Upper Austria there are inter alia the following Reichsstraßen:

- Braunauer Reichsstraße (known today as the Innviertler Straße and Bundesstraße 137)
- Krumauer Reichsstraße (known today as the Rohrbacher Straße and Bundesstraße 127)
- Pragueer Reichsstraße (known today as the Prager Straße and Bundesstraße 125)
- Salzburger Reichsstraße (known today as the Wiener Straße and Bundesstraße 1)
- Schärdinger Reichsstraße (known today as the Innviertler Straße and Bundesstraße 137)
- Spitaler Reichsstraße (known today as the Pyhrnpass Straße and Bundesstraße 138)
- Wiener Reichsstraße (known today as the Wiener Straße and Bundesstraße 1)

== Salzburg ==
In Salzburg there are inter alia the following Reichsstraßen:

- Kärntner Reichsstraße (known today as the Katschberg Straße and Bundesstraße 99)

== Styria ==
In the Styria there are inter alia the following Reichsstraßen:

- Triester Reichsstraße
- Ungarstraße (known today as the Gleisdorfer Straße and Bundesstraße 65)

== Tyrol ==
In Tyrol (then including South Tyrol and Trentino) there are inter alia the following Reichsstraßen:

- Italiener Reichsstraße
- Judikarien Reichsstraße
- Valsugana Reichsstraße

== Vorarlberg ==
In Vorarlberg there are inter alia the following Reichsstraßen:

- Arlbergstraße (known today as the Vorarlberger Straße and Bundesstraße 197)
- Liechtensteiner Straße (known today as the Bundesstraße 191)

== Bohemia ==
In Bohemia (today Czech Republic) there are inter alia the following Reichsstraßen:

- Beraun-Haselbacher Reichsstraße from Prague via Pilsen as far as the Bavarian border (replaced by the D 5, today designated as the II/605)
- Budweiser Reichsstraße from Prague to Budweis (replaced by the D 3, today designated as the II/603)
- Chrudimer Reichsstraße
- Dobrisch-Winterberger Reichsstraße from Prague via Winterberg as far as the Bavarian border (I/4)
- Joachimsthaler Reichsstraße from Karlsbad via Joachimsthal as far as Saxon border (known today as the I/25)
- Jungbunzlau-Trautenauer Reichsstraße (known today as the I/16)
- Karlsbader Reichsstraße from Prague bis Karlsbad (known today as the I/6)
- Komotauer Reichsstraße
- Reichenberger Reichsstraße

== Moravia ==
In Moravia (today Czech Republic) there are inter alia the following Reichsstraßen:

- Trübauer Reichsstraße
- Olmützer Reichsstraße

== Austrian-Silesia ==
In Austrian-Silesia (today parts of Czech Republic and Poland) there are inter alia the following Reichsstraßen:

- Ostrau-Teschener Reichsstraße (known today as the I/11)
- Teschen-Jablunkauer Reichsstraße (known today as the I/11)
- Troppau-Freudenthaler Reichsstraße (known today as the I/11)
- Troppau-Olbersdorfer Reichsstraße (known today as the I/57)
- Zuckmantel-Rothenberger Reichsstraße (known today as the I/44)

== Galicia ==
In Galicia (today parts of Poland and Ukraine) there are inter alia the following Reichsstraßen:

- Tatraer Reichsstraße from Brünn to Lemberg (via Sanok and Sambir) today Droga krajowa 28 in Poland and M 11 in Ukraine
- Krakauer Reichsstraße (known today as the Droga krajowa 4 in Poland and M 10 in Ukraine)
- Podolier Reichsstraße (known today as the N 02 in Ukraine)

== Carniola ==
In Carniola (known today as Slovenia) there are inter alia the following Reichsstraßen:

- Agramer Reichsstraße from Laibach to Agram / Zagreb
- Karlstädter Reichsstraße from Rudolfswerth to Karlstadt / Karlovac
- Loibler Reichsstraße from Krainburg to Loibl Pass
- Wiener Reichsstraße from Ljubljana / Laibach to Wien
- Wurzner Reichsstraße from Krainburg to Wurzen Pass / Korensko sedlo
