= Highway H22 (Ukraine) =

Highway in Ukraine

Highway H22
- Автошлях Н22
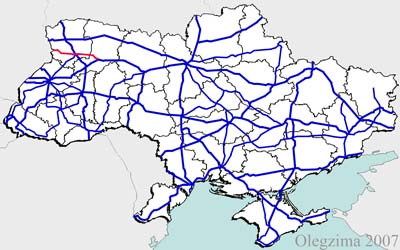

Route information
- Length: 155.9 km (96.9 mi)

Major junctions
- West end: Polish border at Ustyluh
- East end: Rivne

Location
- Country: Ukraine
- Oblasts: Volyn, Rivne

Highway system
- Roads in Ukraine; State Highways
| ← H 21 | → H 23 |

H22 is a Ukrainian national highway (H-highway) connecting the city of Rivne with the Poland-Ukraine border.

== Main route ==
Main route and connections to/intersections with other highways in Ukraine.

| Marker | Main settlements | Notes | Highway Interchanges |
|---|---|---|---|
Volyn Oblast
| 0 km | Ustyluh | | Poland-Ukraine border |
| | Volodymyr-Volynskyi | | P15 |
| | Lutsk | | E85 M 19 • H 17 • P14 |
Rivne Oblast
| 155.9 km | Rivne | | Soborna vulytsia (transition) |

== See also ==
- Roads in Ukraine
- Ukraine Highways
- International E-road network
- Pan-European corridors
