= Highway M07 (Ukraine) =

Highway in Ukraine

Highway M07
- Автошлях М07
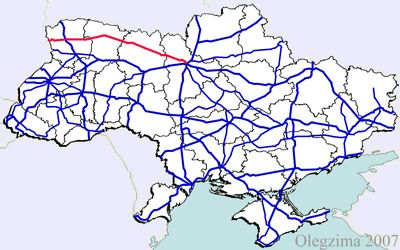

Route information
- Part of E373
- Length: 486.5 km (302.3 mi) 488.4 km (303.5 mi) with access roads

Major junctions
- East end: M 05/ M 01/ M 03/ M 06/ H 01/ H 07 in Kyiv
- M 19 in Kovel
- West end: Polish border at Yahodyn checkpoint

Location
- Country: Ukraine
- Oblasts: Kyiv, Kyiv, Zhytomyr, Rivne, Volyn

Highway system
- Roads in Ukraine; State Highways
← M 06	→ M 08

Highway M07 is a Ukrainian international highway (M-highway) connecting Kyiv to Yahodyn on the border with Poland, where it continues into Poland as National Road 12 (DK12).

In Soviet times, the M07 was identified as A255. Today, the highway stretches through four oblasts and ends at the border checkpoint Yahodyn in Liuboml Raion (Volyn Oblast). The entire route is part of European route E373.

The highway was planned in 1966 and constructed between 1967 and 1983. In common speech the road is known as Varshavka (Ukrainian: Варшавка), as its general course leads from Kyiv in the direction of Warsaw.

== Route ==
Marker	Main settlements	Notes	Highway Interchanges
0 km	Kyiv		E95/ E101( M 05 - M 01) • E40( M 03 - M 06) • H 01 • H 07
	Kovel		E85 M 19
486 km	Yahodyn / Border (Poland)		E37312 (Poland)

== Gallery ==
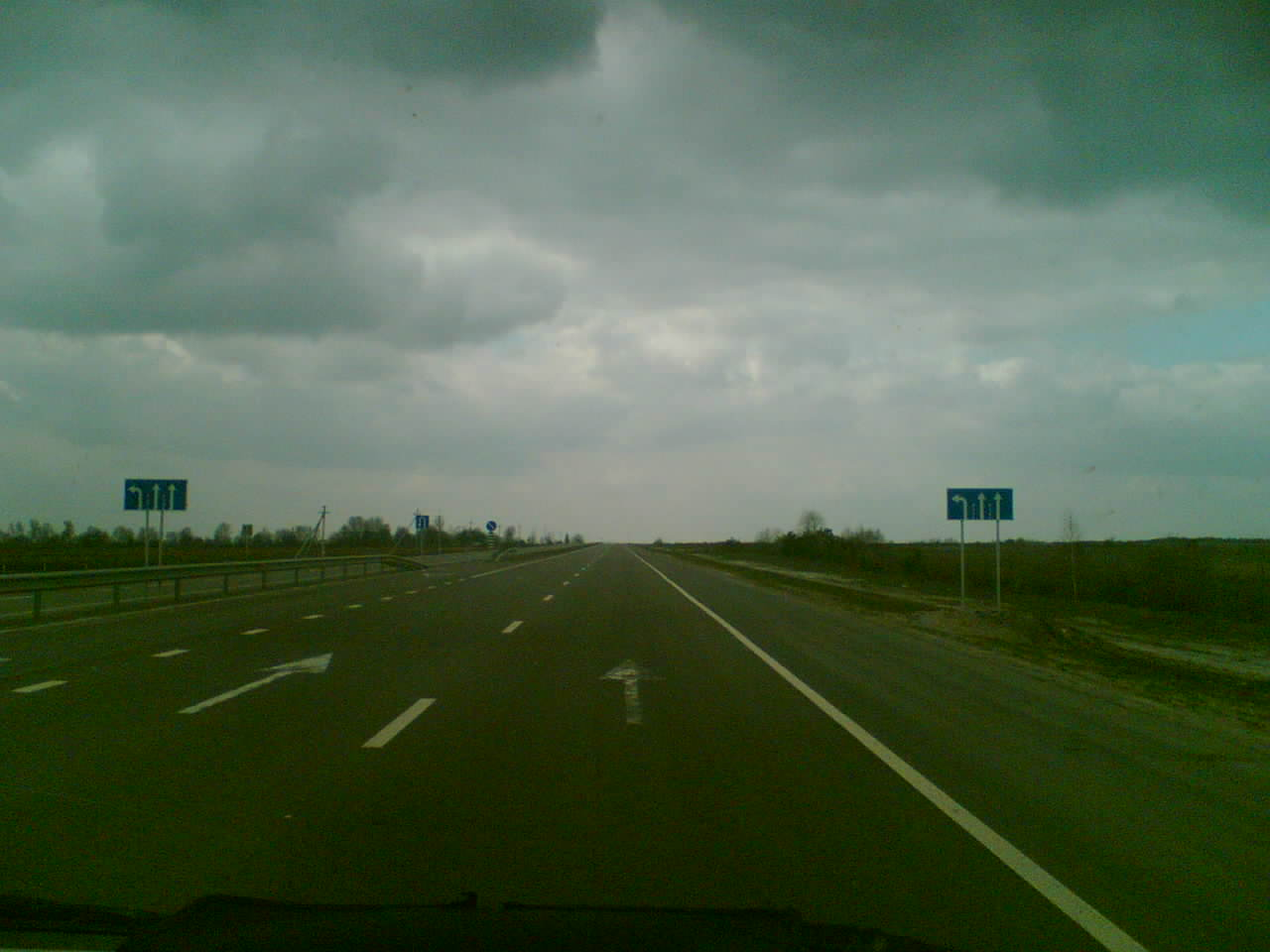
M07 Highway near Lyuboml'

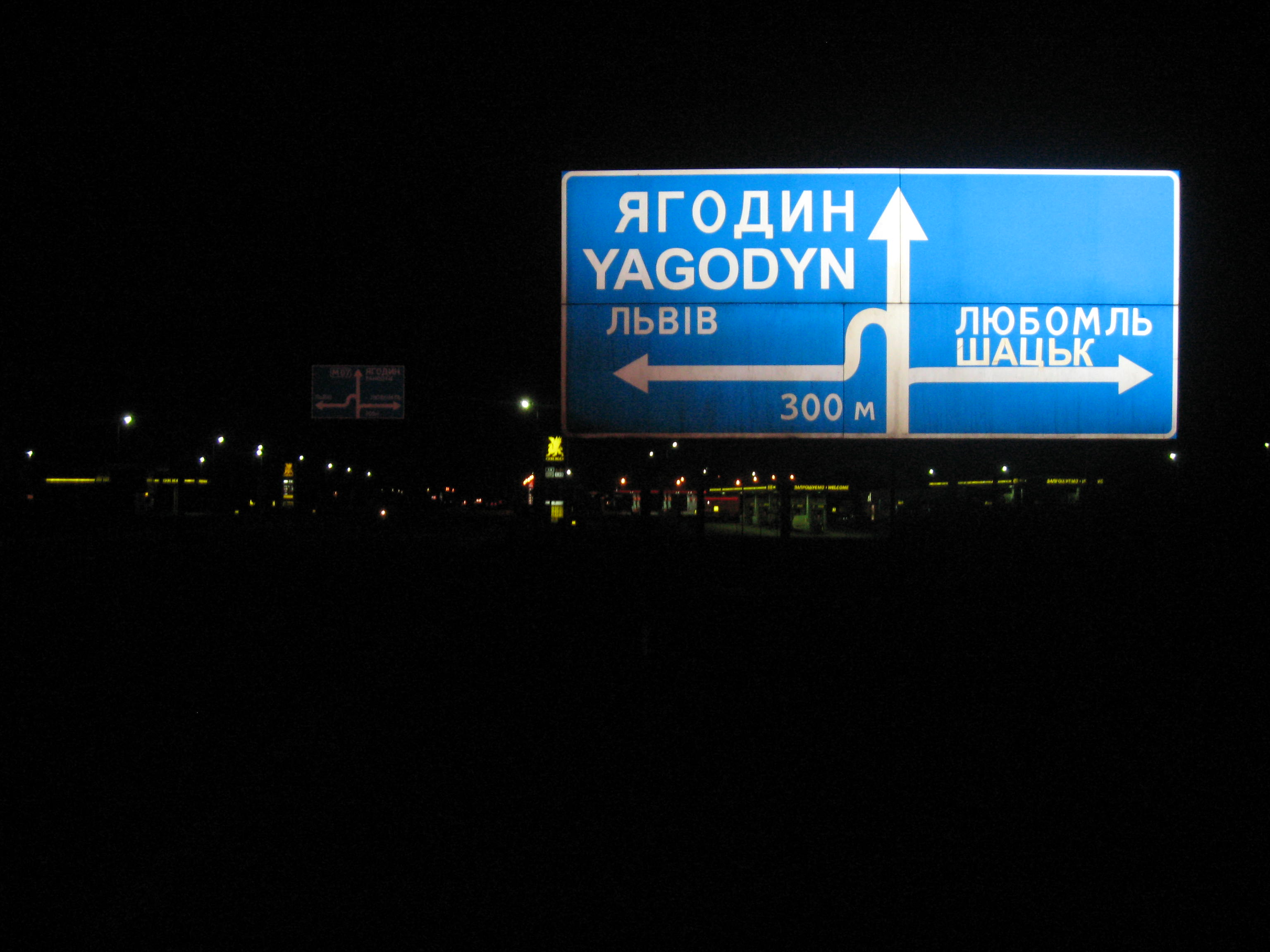
M07 in Volyn Oblast

== See also ==
- Roads in Ukraine
- Ukraine Highways
- International E-road network
- Pan-European corridors
