= Highway M19 (Ukraine) =

Highway in Ukraine

Highway M19
- Автошлях М19
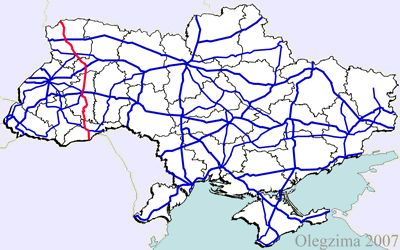

Route information
- Part of E85
- Length: 503.9 km (313.1 mi)

Major junctions
- North end: M 12 at Belarusian border
- M 07 at Kovel; M 06 at Dubno; M 12 at Ternopil
- South end: DN2 at Romanian border

Location
- Country: Ukraine
- Oblasts: Volyn, Rivne, Ternopil, Chernivtsi

Highway system
- Roads in Ukraine; State Highways
← M 18	→ M 20

Highway M19 is a Ukrainian international highway (M-highway) that completely corresponds to whole length of European route E85 that runs through Ukraine.

Crossing Western Ukraine from north to south, it connects the historical region Volhynia (border with Belarus) with Southern Bukovina (border of Romania).

== Main route ==
Main route and connections to/intersections with other highways in Ukraine.

Marker	Main settlements	Highway Interchanges
0 km	Domanove / Border (Belarus)	M 12
	Kovel	M 07
	Lutsk	H 17 • H 22
	Dubno	M 06
	Ternopil	M 12
	Chernivtsi	H 03 • H 10
504 km	Porubne / Border (Romania)	DN2

== Gallery ==
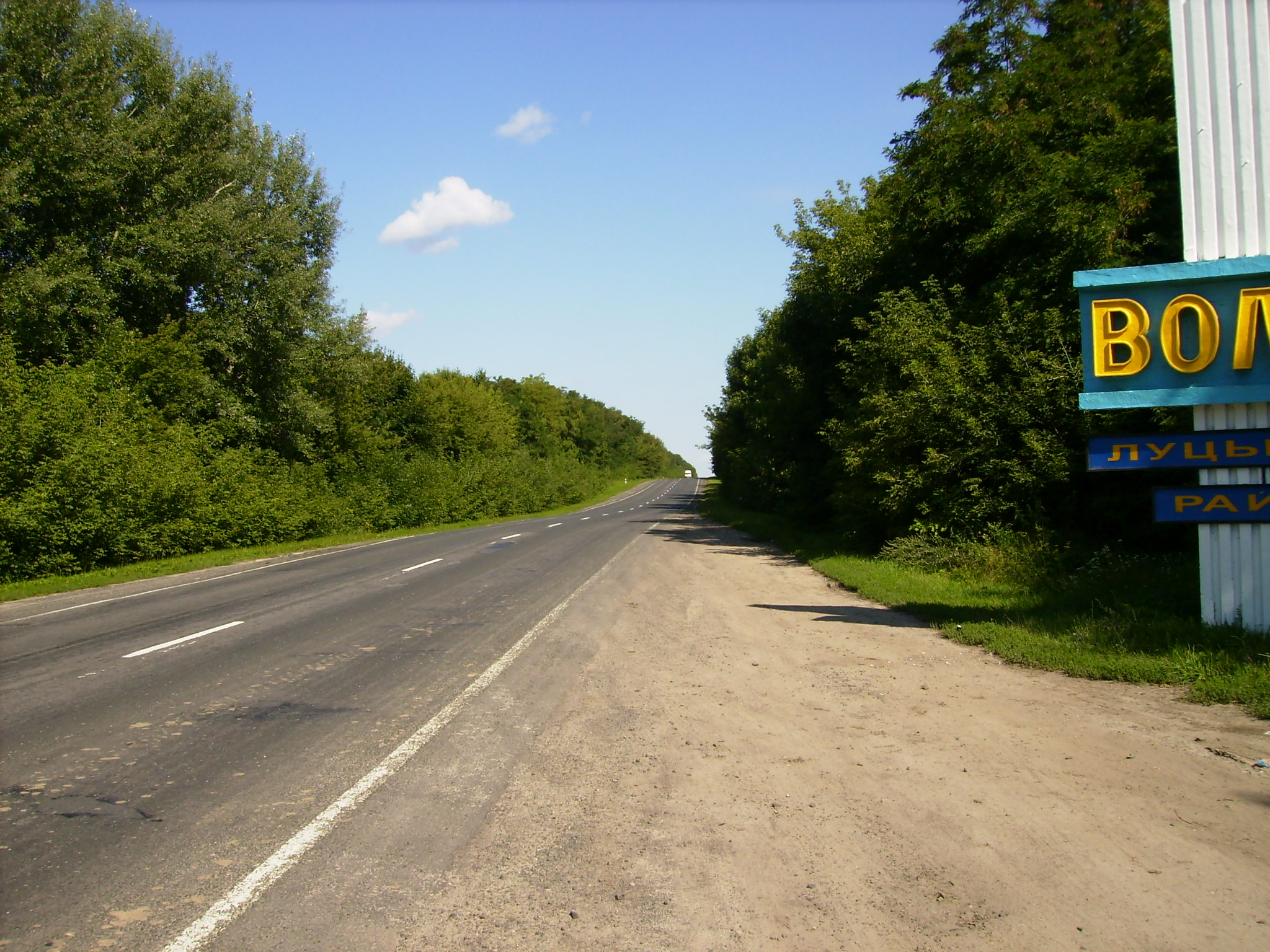
Highway M19 near Lutsk

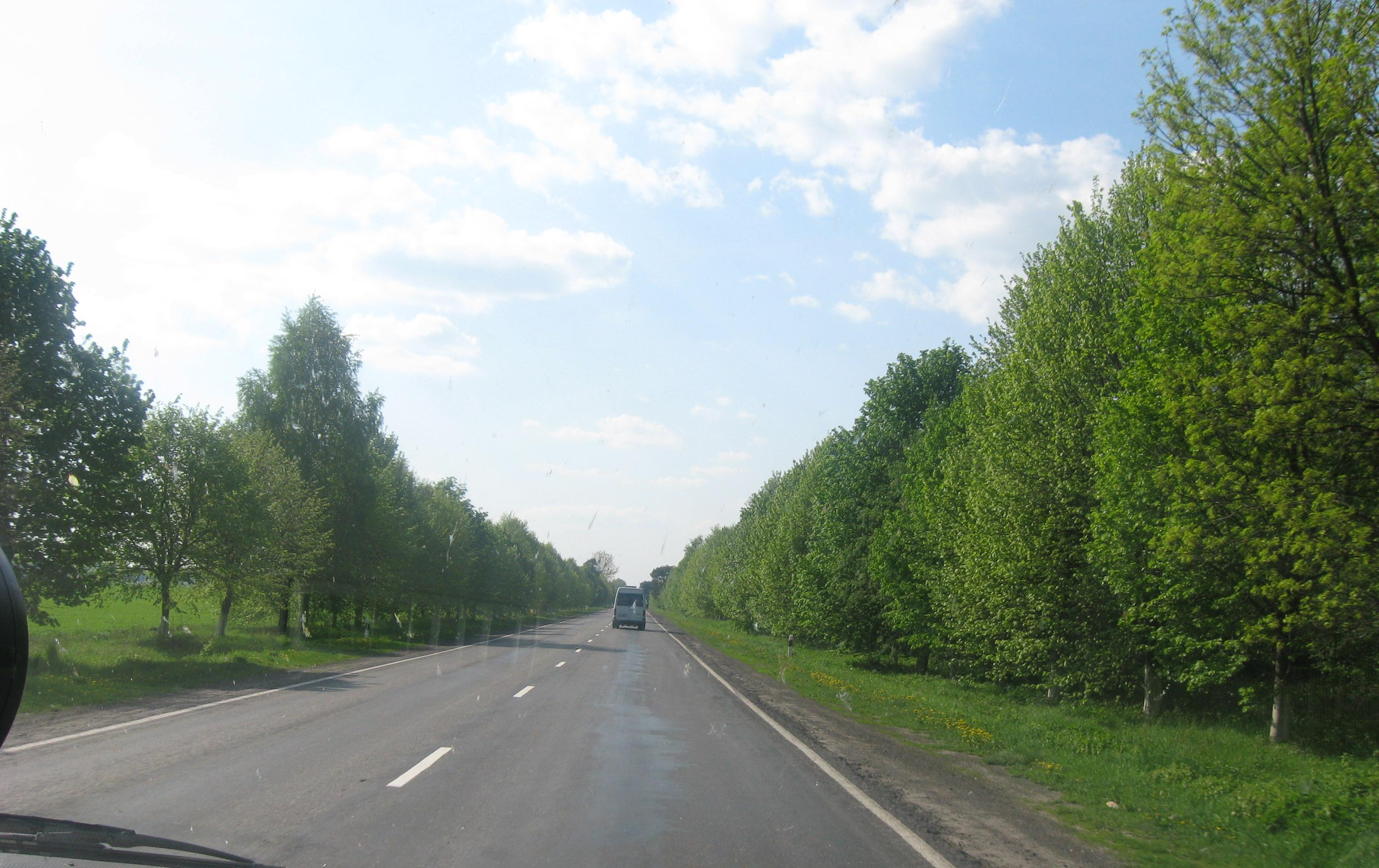
M19 in Volyn Oblast

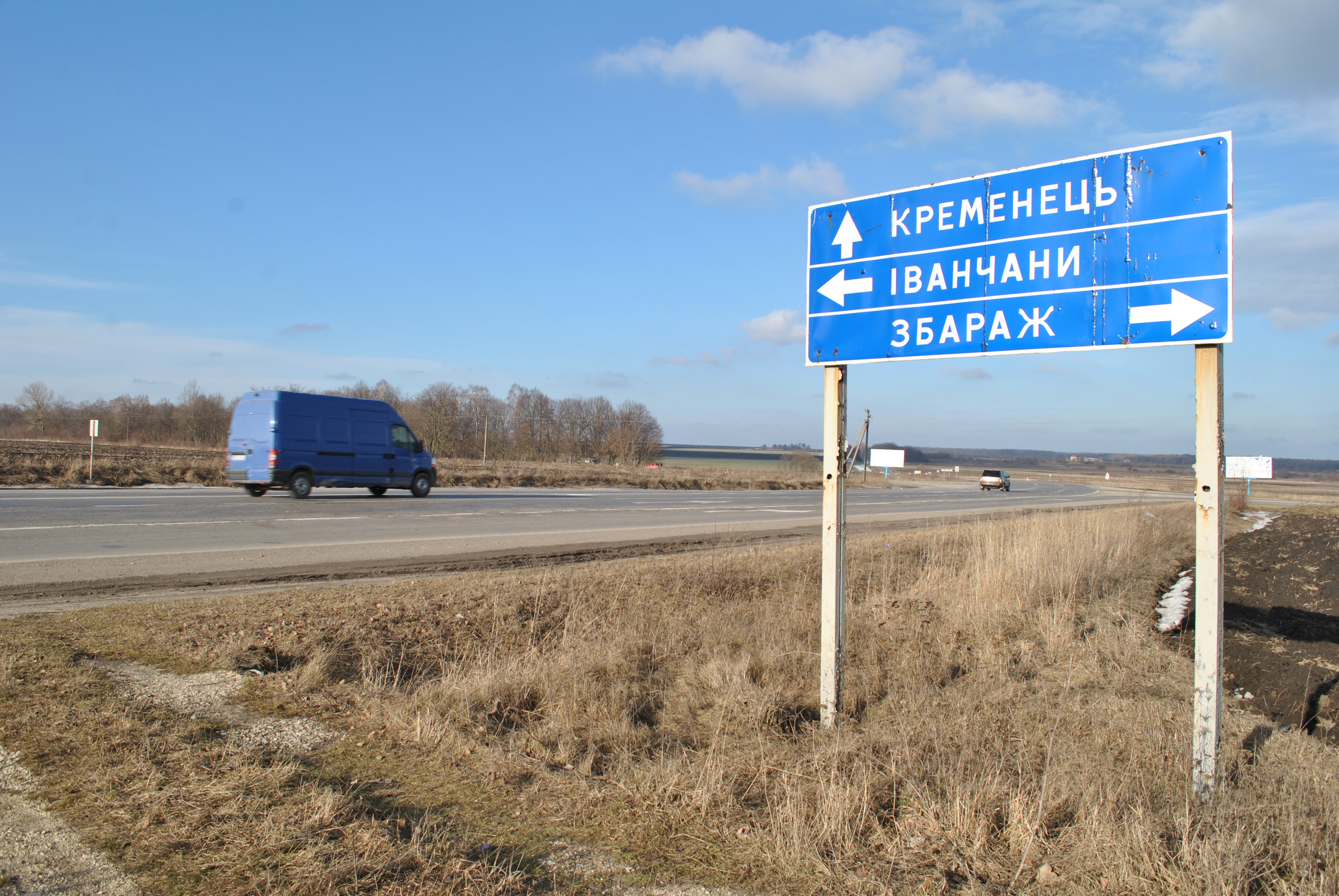
M19 road near Zbarazh

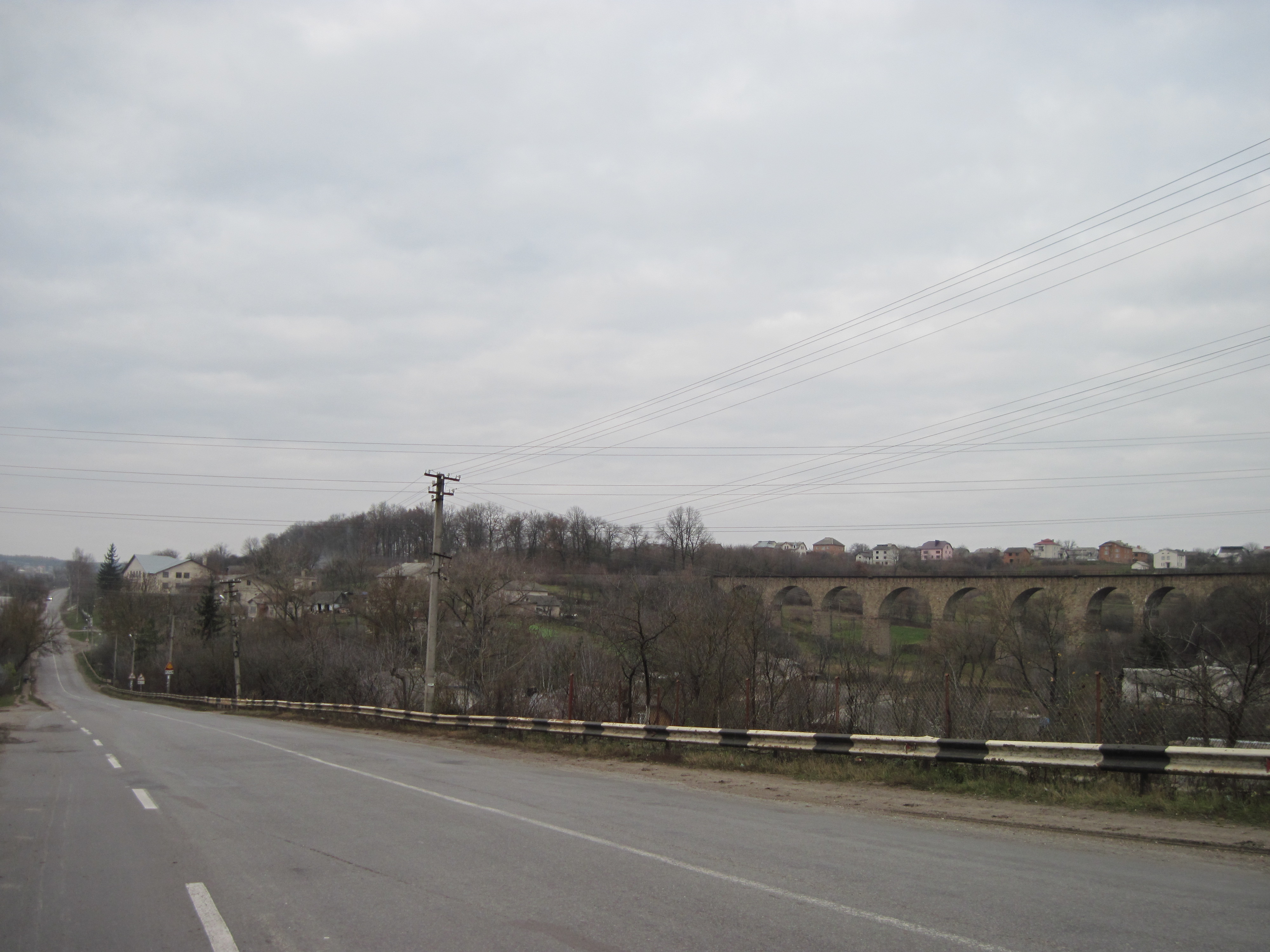
An old viaduct near the highway

== See also ==
- Roads in Ukraine
- Ukraine Highways
- International E-road network
- Pan-European corridors
