= European route E471 =

Road in trans-European E-road network

E471

Route information
- Length: 225 km (140 mi)

Major junctions
- From: Mukachevo
- To: Lviv

Location
- Countries: Ukraine

Highway system
- International E-road network; A Class; B Class

E 471 is a European B class road in Ukraine, connecting the cities Mukachevo and Lviv.

== Route and E-road junctions ==
- Ukraine (on shared signage M 06)
  - Mukachevo: E50
  - Lviv: E40, E372
