= European route E373 =

Road in trans-European E-road network

E373

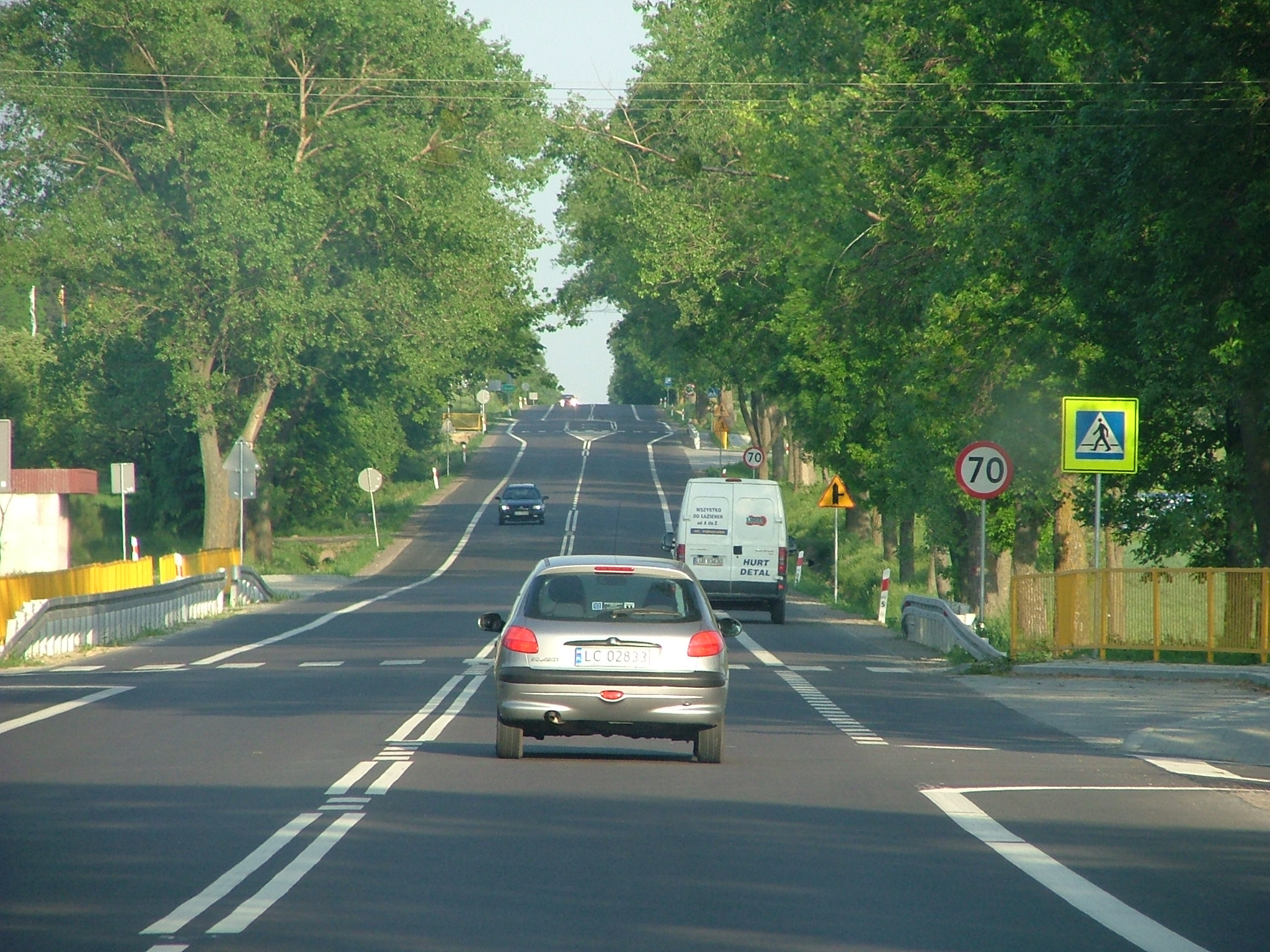

Route information
- Length: 606 km (377 mi)

Major junctions
- West end: Lublin (Poland)
- East end: Kyiv (Ukraine)

Location
- Countries: Poland; Ukraine

Highway system
- International E-road network; A Class; B Class

The European road E373 or E373 is a European road running from Lublin in Poland to Kyiv in Ukraine.

== General ==
The European road E373 is a Class B connection road and connects the Polish city Lublin with the Ukrainian city Kyiv which makes it at a length of approximately 590 kilometers. The route has been recorded by the UNECE as follows: Lublin - Kovel - Kyiv.

== Route ==
- Poland
  - DK 12: Lublin - Chełm (Lublin-Piaski concurrent with European route E372)
- Ukraine
  - M 07: Kovel - Kyiv
