= European route E372 =

Road in trans-European E-road network

E372

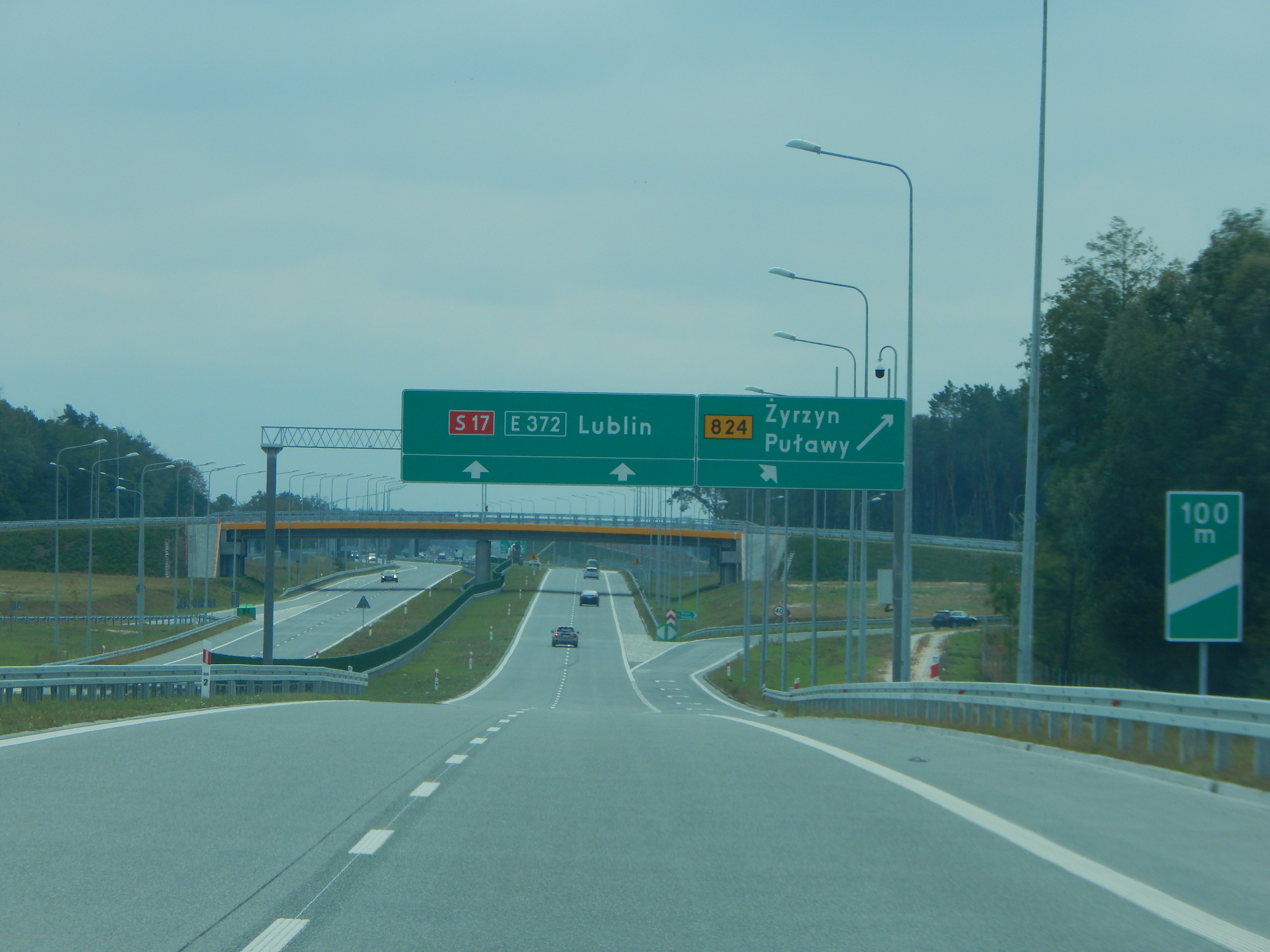

Route information
- Length: 394 km (245 mi)

Major junctions
- North end: Warsaw (Poland)
- South end: Lviv (Ukraine)

Location
- Countries: Ukraine; Poland

Highway system
- International E-road network; A Class; B Class

European route E 372 is a B-type road part of the International E-road network. It begins in Warsaw, Poland and ends in Lviv, Ukraine. It is 367 km (228 mi) long. There are often hour-long delays at the Polish-Ukrainian border.

== Route ==
- Poland
  - DK 17: Zakręt – Majdan ( E30)
  - S 17: Majdan ( E30) – Garwolin – Ryki – Kurów
  - S 12 / S 17: Kurów – Lublin ( E373)
  - S 12 / S 17 / S 19: Lublin ( E373)
  - S 12 / S 17: Lublin ( E373) – Piaski ( E373)
  - DK 17: Piaski – Krasnystaw – Zamość – Tomaszów Lubelski – Hrebenne
- Ukraine
  - M 09: Rava-Ruska – Lviv
