= State highways (Ukraine) =

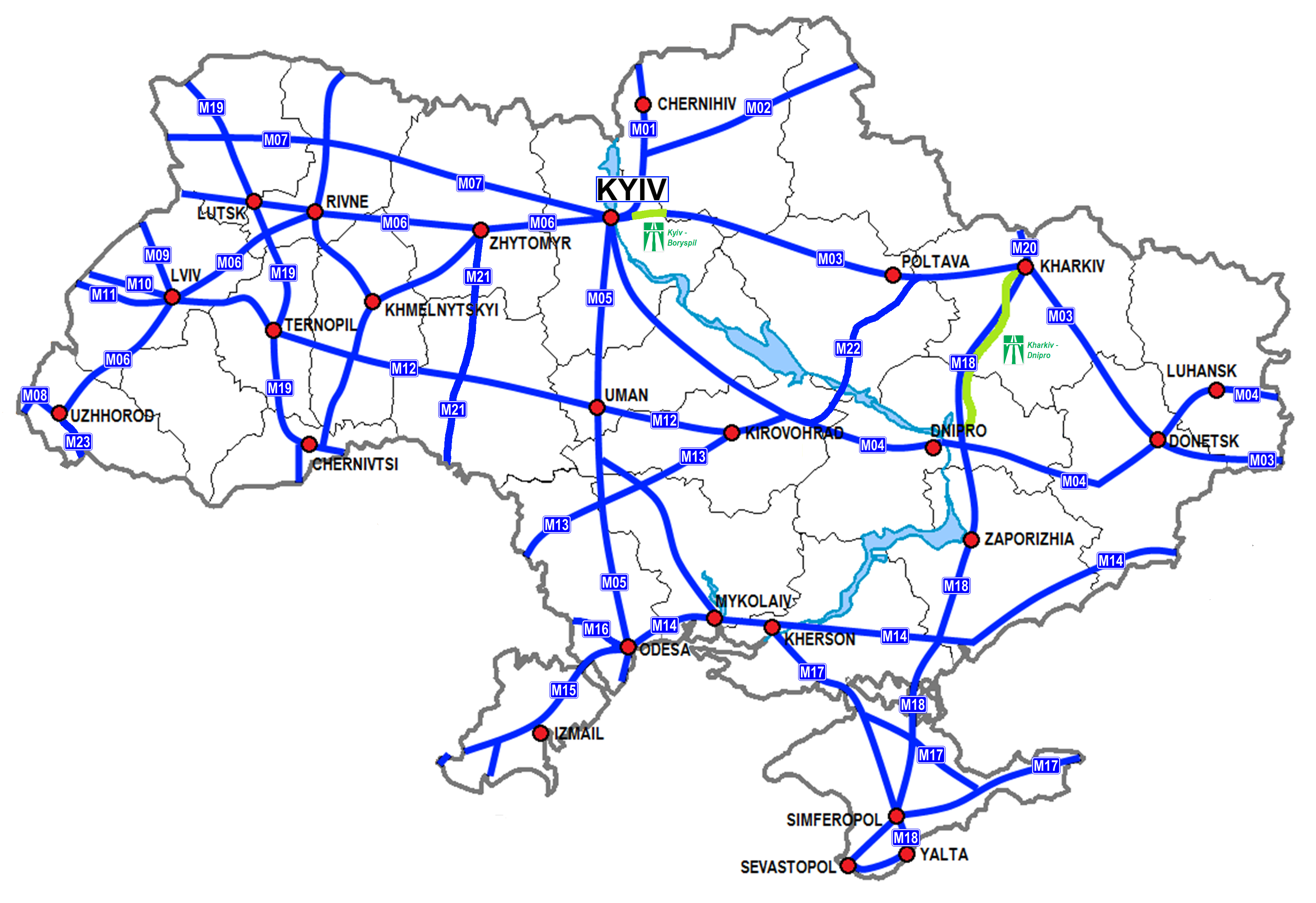
A map of state highways in Ukraine

State highways in Ukraine (Ukrainian: автомобільні дороги державного значення) are subdivided into four categories: international (M-network), national (H-network), regional (P-network), and territorial (Т-network). The letter's indexes are in Cyrillic, standing for their respective abbreviations in Ukrainian.

== List of international highways in Ukraine ==
International highways in Ukraine are the roads in Ukraine on routes involving international transport corridors and/or highways that are part of the European network. The international highways in Ukraine are identified with the letter M for the Ukrainian designation (Mizhnarodni), followed by the double digits 01 through 30. Usually their major routes of freeways detour around highly congested areas such as cities; however, these highways also might have some branches with the same identification signs posted while going through such congested areas. Some of these highways, especially around major cities have 8, 10, or more lanes.

There are 28 international highways of Ukraine with a total length of 9,331.1 km (5,798.1 mi). Those highways encompass 4.9% of all highways in the country. In the following list, all lengths are given by the major route. When branches (or exits) are mentioned and added to the length, the total length then measured including the entire network, not as an alternative route (compare with business route).

Highway	Route	Length	Notes
M01	Kyiv - Chernihiv - Novi Yarylovychi	Length 242.9 km or 150.9 mi (with access roads - 260.7 km or 162.0 mi)	Southern entrance to Chernihiv, length - 11.9 km (7.4 mi); Northern entrance to Chernihiv, length - 1.1 km (0.68 mi); Eastern entrance to Brovary, length - 4.8 km (3.0 mi)
M02	Kipti - Hlukhiv - Bachivsk	Length 260.2 km (161.7 mi)	
M03	Kyiv - Kharkiv - Dovzhanskyi	Length 932.7 km or 579.6 mi (with access roads - 947.5 km or 588.7 mi)	Kharkiv southeast bypass, length - 13.7 km (8.5 mi); Entrance to Poltava, length - 1.1 km (0.68 mi)
M04	Znamianka - Luhansk - Izvaryne (to Volgograd, Russia via Dnipro and Donetsk)		Merged with M12 in 2021 to form the M30
M05	Kyiv - Odesa	Length 560.8 km or 348.5 mi (with access roads - 563.6 km or 350.2 mi)	Entrance to Bila Tserkva, length - 2.3 km (1.4 mi); Access to highway P19, length - 0.5 km (0.31 mi)
M06	Kyiv - Chop (to Budapest, Hungary via Lviv, Mukachevo, Uzhhorod)	Length 902.2 km or 560.6 mi (with access roads - 928 km or 577 mi)	Eastern entrance to Zhytomyr, length - 2.8 km (1.7 mi); Western entrance to Zhytomyr, length - 6.2 km (3.9 mi); Eastern entrance to Zviahel, length - 3 km (1.9 mi); Western entrance to Zviahel, length - 1.6 km (0.99 mi); Eastern entrance to Lviv, length - 5.7 km (3.5 mi); Northern entrance to Uzhhorod, length - 2.3 km (1.4 mi); Western entrance to Rivne, length - 3.3 km (2.1 mi); Southern entrance to Rivne, length - 0.9 km (0.56 mi)
M07	Kyiv - Kovel - Yahodyn (to Lublin, Poland)	Length 499.7 km or 310.5 mi (with access roads - 500.3 km or 310.9 mi)	Entrance to "Yahodyn" customs-control terminal No. 2, length - 0.1 km (0.062 mi); Entrance to "Yahodyn" customs-control terminal No. 3, length - 1.8 km (1.1 mi)
M08	Uzhhorod bypass - "Uzhhorod" checkpoint	Length 17.1 km or 10.6 mi (with access roads - 18.2 km or 11.3 mi)	Entrance to cargo terminal, length - 1.1 km (0.68 mi)
M09	Ternopil - Lviv - Rava Ruska (to Lublin, Poland)	Length 175 km (109 mi)	
M10	Lviv - Krakovets (to Kraków, Poland)	Length 70.2 km or 43.6 mi (with access roads - 85.8 km or 53.3 mi)	Lviv western bypass, length - 15.6 km (9.7 mi)
M11	Lviv - Shehyni (to Kraków, Poland)	Length 71.6 km or 44.5 mi (with access roads - 76.9 km or 47.8 mi)	Horodok southern bypass, length - 5.3 km (3.3 mi)
M12	Stryi - Ternopil - Kropyvnytskyi - Znamianka		Merged with M04 in 2021 to form the M30
M13	Kropyvnytskyi - Platonove (to Chișinău, Moldova)	Length 258.6 km (160.7 mi)	
M14	Odesa - Melitopol - Novoazovsk	Length 691.3 km or 429.6 mi (with access roads - 715.6 km or 444.7 mi)	Access to highway P47, length - 2 km (1.2 mi); Entrance to Kherson, length - 5.6 km (3.5 mi); Melitopol bypass, length - 16.7 km (10.4 mi)
M15	Odesa - Reni (to Bucharest, Romania)	Length 297.7 km (185.0 mi) (with access roads - 299.5 km or 186.1 mi)	Entrance to Izmail, length 1.1 km (0.68 mi); Entrance to Reni, length 0.7 km (0.43 mi)
M16	Odesa - Kuchurhan (to Chișinău, Moldova)	Length 58.9 km (36.6 mi)	
M17	Kherson - Dzhankoi - Feodosia - Kerch (Note: The section running through Crimea is classified as 35A-001 by Russia. Ukraine does not recognize this designation.)	Length 403.5 km (250.7 mi)	
M18	Kharkiv - Simferopol - Alushta - Yalta (Note: The section running through Crimea is classified as 35A-002 by Russia. Ukraine does not recognize this designation.)	Length 703.8 km or 437.3 mi (with access roads - 723.9 km or 449.8 mi)	Kharkiv southwestern bypass, length - 8 km (5.0 mi); Simferopol bypass, length - 12.1 km (7.5 mi)
M19	Domanove - Kovel - Chernivtsi - Terebleche (to Bucharest, Romania)	Length 534.1 km or 331.9 mi (with access roads - 542.7 km or 337.2 mi)	Southern entrance to Chernivtsi, length - 3.4 km (2.1 mi); Northern entrance to Lutsk, length - 5.2 km (3.2 mi)
M20	Kharkiv - Shcherbakivka	Length 28.4 km (17.6 mi)	
M21	Vystupovychi - Zhytomyr - Mohyliv-Podilskiy (via Vinnytsia)	Length 410.7 km or 255.2 mi (with access roads - 417.4 km or 259.4 mi)	Northern entrance to Berdychiv, length - 3.2 km (2.0 mi); Southern entrance to Berdychiv, length - 3.3 km (2.1 mi); Access to Kalynivka, length - 0.2 km (0.12 mi)
M22	Poltava - Oleksandriia	Length 148.2 km or 92.1 mi (with access roads - 150.6 km or 93.6 mi)	Entrance to Kozelshchyna, length - 2.4 km (1.5 mi)
M23	Berehove - Vynohradiv - Velyka Kopanya	Length 50 km (31 mi)	
M24	Velyka Dobron - Mukachevo - Berehove - "Luzhanka" border checkpoint	Length 60.5 km or 37.6 mi (with access roads - 62.1 km or 38.6 mi)	Access to highway M06, length - 1.6 km (0.99 mi); Formerly highway P54 before 2013
M25	"Solomonovo" checkpoint - Velyka Dobron - Yanoshi	Length 55.1 km or 34.2 mi (with access roads - 58.9 km or 36.6 mi)	Access to "Kosino" checkpoint, length - 3.8 km (2.4 mi)
M26	Vylok - Nevetlenfolu - "Dyakove" checkpoint	Length 20.6 km or 12.8 mi (with access roads - 32.0 km or 19.9 mi)	Access to "Vylok" checkpoint, length - 0.2 km (0.12 mi); Access to "Velyka Palad" checkpoint, length - 11.2 km (7.0 mi); Formerly highway P55 before 2013
M27	Odesa - Chornomorsk	Length 14.1 km (8.8 mi)	Formerly highway H04 until 2013
M28	Odesa - Pivdenne to highway M14	Length 37.2 km or 23.1 mi (with access roads - 74 km or 46 mi)	Odesa bypass, length - 24.9 km (15.5 mi); Eastern entrance to Pivdennyi Port, length - 6.8 km (4.2 mi); Northern entrance to Pivdennyi Port, length - 5.1 km (3.2 mi); Formerly T-16-06 before 2013
M29	Kharkiv - Krasnohrad - Pereshchepyne - Dnipro	Length 198.9 km or 123.6 mi (with access roads - 201.3 km or 125.1 mi)	Access to Highway M18, length - 2.4 km (1.5 mi)
M30	Stryi - Uman - Dnipro - Izvaryne (via Vinnytsia and Kropyvnytskyi)	Length 1,402.5 km (871.5 mi) (with access roads - 1,440.6 km or 895.1 mi)	Eastern entrance to Vinnytsia, length - 0.8 km (0.50 mi); Western entrance to Khmelnytskyi, length - 3.5 km (2.2 mi); Eastern entrance to Khmelnytskyi, length - 4.5 km (2.8 mi); Entrance to Khmelnytskyi Airport, length - 0.7 km (0.43 mi); Dnipro bypass, length - 21.9 km (13.6 mi); Entrance to Znamianka, length - 1.3 km (0.81 mi); Entrance to Luhansk, length - 1.8 km (1.1 mi); Entrance to Rohatyn, length - 3.6 km (2.2 mi); Formerly M04 and M12 before 2021

== List of national roads in Ukraine ==
Highway	Route	Length	Notes
H01	Kyiv - Znamianka	Length 281.5 km (174.9 mi)	
H02	Highway M06 - Kremenets - Bila Tserkva - Rzhyshchiv - Kaniv - Sofiivka	Length 516.8 km (321.1 mi) (including access roads - 521.3 km or 323.9 mi)	Entrance to Kaniv, length 4.5 km (2.8 mi)
H03	Zhytomyr - Chernivtsi	Length 338.4 kilometres (210.3 mi) (including access roads - 357.3 km or 222.0 mi)	Dunaivtsi bypass, length 7.7 km (4.8 mi); Starokostiantyniv bypass, length 11.2 km (7.0 mi)
H04	Odesa - Chornomorsk		Redesignated as M27 in 2013
H05	Yani Kapu - Simferopol (Note: H05 is classified as 35K-001 by Russia. Ukraine does not recognize this designation.)	Length 115.0 km or 71.5 mi (including access roads - 116.0 km or 72.1 mi)	Entrance to Simferopol International Airport, length - 1 km (0.62 mi)
H06	Simferopol - Bakhchysarai - Sevastopol (Note: H06 is classified as 35P-001 and 67P-1 by Russia. Ukraine does not recognize these designations.)	Length 66.4 km or 41.3 mi (including access roads - 69.3 km or 43.1 mi)	Entrance to Airport "Belbek", length - 2.9 km (1.8 mi)
H07	Kyiv - Sumy - Yunakivka	Length 333.9 km or 207.5 mi (including access roads - 335.1 km or 208.2 mi)	Entrance to Brovary, length - 1.2 km (0.75 mi)
H08	Boryspil - Dnipro - Zaporizhia - Mariupol (via Kremenchuk)	Length 658.4 km or 409.1 mi (including access roads - 678.5 km or 421.6 mi)	Entrance to Dnipro International Airport, length - 5.3 km (3.3 mi); Southern entrance to Dnipro, length - 5.8 km (3.6 mi); Entrance to the island of Khortytsia (highway across the Dnipro River in Zaporizhia), 9.1 km (5.7 mi)
H09	Mukachevo - Rakhiv - Bohorodchany - Ivano-Frankivsk - Rohatyn - Bibrka - Lviv	Length 441.2 km (274.1 mi)	
H10	Stryi - Ivano-Frankivsk - Chernivtsi - Mamalyga (to Chișinău, Moldova)	Length 269.3 km or 167.3 mi (including access roads - 286.6 km or 178.1 mi)	Entrance to Ivano-Frankivsk, length - 4.1 km (2.5 mi); Entrance to Tysmenytsia, length - 6.8 km (4.2 mi); Zabolotova bypass, length - 6.4 km (4.0 mi)
H11	Dnipro - Mykolaiv (via Kryvyi Rih)	Length 240.7 km (149.6 mi)	
H12	Sumy - Poltava	Length 150.2 km or 93.3 mi (including access roads - 169.3 km or 105.2 mi)	Sumy bypass, 19.1 km (11.9 mi)
H13	Lviv - Sambir - Uzhhorod	Length 231.4 km (143.8 mi)	
H14	Oleksandrivka - Kropyvnytskyi - Mykolaiv	Length 232.2 km or 144.3 mi (including access roads - 244.0 km or 151.6 mi)	Kropyvnytskyi southern bypass, length - 11.8 km (7.3 mi)
H15	Zaporizhia - Donetsk	Length 210.4 km (130.7 mi)	
H16	Zolotonosha - Cherkasy - Smila - Uman	Length 217.3 km (135.0 mi)	
H17	Lviv - Radekhiv - Lutsk	Length 129.8 km (80.7 mi)	
H18	Ivano-Frankivsk - Buchach - Ternopil	Length 106.8 km (66.4 mi)	
H19	Yalta - Sevastopol (Note: H19 is classified as 35K-002 and 67K-1 by Russia. Ukraine does not recognize these designations.)	Length 80.7 km (50.1 mi)	
H20	Sloviansk - Donetsk - Mariupol	Length 219.6 km (136.5 mi)	Formerly P40 before 1998 and P19 from 1999 to 2006
H21	Starobilsk - Luhansk - Khrustalny - Makiivka - Donetsk	Length 221.1 km (137.4 mi)	
H22	Ustyluh - Lutsk - Rivne	Length 148.0 km (92.0 mi) (including access roads - 149.4 km or 92.8 mi	Ustyluh bypass, length 1.4 km (0.87 mi)
H23	Kropyvnytskyi - Kryvyi Rih - Zaporizhia	Length 262.5 km (163.1 mi) (including access roads - 264.7 km or 164.5 mi)	Entrance to Kryvyi Rih Airport, length 2.2 km (1.4 mi)
H24	Blahovishchenske - Mykolaiv (via Voznesensk)	Length 225.2 km (139.9 mi) (including access roads - 227.5 km or 141.4 mi)	Entrance to Mykolaiv Airport, length 2.3 km (1.4 mi); Formerly P06 until 2017
H25	Horodyshche - Rivne - Starokostiantyniv	Length 295.8 km (183.8 mi) (including access roads - 300.9 km or 187.0 mi)	Northern entrance to Rivne, length 2.7 km (1.7 mi); Entrance to Netishyn, length 2.4 km (1.5 mi); Formerly P05 until 2017
H26	Chuhuiv - Milove (via Starobelsk)	Length 297.4 km (184.8 mi)	Formerly P07 until 2017
H27	Chernihiv - Mena - Sosnytsia - Hremiach	Length 206.8 km (128.5 mi)	Formerly P12 until 2017
H28	Highway H27 - Horodnia - checkpoint "Senkivka"	Length 75.8 km (47.1 mi)	Formerly P13 until 2017
H30	Vasilivka - Berdyansk	Length 136.3 km (84.7 mi)	
H31	Dnipro - Tsarychanka - Kobeliaky - Reshetylivka	Length 159.7 km (99.2 mi)	Formerly P52 until 2017
H32	Pokrovsk - Bakhmut - Mykhailivka	Length 131.5 km (81.7 mi)	
H33	Odesa - Bilhorod-Dnistrovskyi - Monashi - Highway M15	Length 93.2 km (57.9 mi) (including access roads - 97.2 km or 60.4 mi)	Entrance to the Port of Chornomorsk, length - 4 km (2.5 mi); Formerly P70 until 2017

== List of regional roads in Ukraine ==
- P01: Kyiv - Obukhiv
- P02: Kyiv - Ivankiv - Ovruch, entrances to the Chernobyl Nuclear Power Plant (Dytiatky checkpoint) and memorial complex in Novi Petrivtsi
- P03: Northeast Kyiv bypass, access to highway M03
- P04: Kyiv - Fastiv - Bila Tserkva - Tarascha - Zvenyhorodka, entrances No.1 and No.2 to the city of Fastiv
- P05: Dytiatky checkpoint - "Pripyat" checkpoint, entrance to the Chernobyl Nuclear Power Plant and the villages of Straholissya and Stari Sokole
  - P05: Horodyshche - Sarny - Rivne - Starokostiantyniv, north and south entrances to the city of Rivne, entrance to the city of Netishyn; redesignated as H25 in 2017
- P06: "Chernobyl" checkpoint - "Ovruch" checkpoint, entrances to the cities of Pripyat and Chernobyl and the villages of Buryakivka and Maryanivka
  - P06: Blahovishchenske - Voznesensk - Mykolaiv, entrance to Mykolaiv International Airport, former highway M23, redesignated as H24 in 2017
- P07: Chuhuiv - Starobelsk - Milove; redesignated as H26 in 2017
- P08: Nemyriv - Yampil
- P09: Myronivka - Kaniv - Sofiyivka
- P10: Kaniv - Chyhyryn - Kremenchuk, entrance to the village of Subotiv; former P15
- P11: Poltava - Krasnohrad
- P12: Chernihiv - Mena - Sosnytsia - Hremyach, entrance to the city of Novhorod-Siversky; redesignated as H27 in 2017
- P13: Chernihiv - Horodnia - Senkivka; redesignated as H28 in 2017
- P14: Lutsk - Kivertsi - Manevychi - Liubeshiv - Dolsk to the border with Belarus
- P15: Kovel - Volodymyr - Chervonohrad - Zhovkva, entrance to the city of Volodymyr
  - P15: Kaniv - Chyhyryn - Kremenchuk, entrance to the village of Subotiv; redesignated as P10 in 2009
- P16: Entrance to sensitive sites in the Crimea
- P17: Bila Tserkva - Tetiiv - Lypovets - Gumenne to highway M30
- P18: Zhytomyr - Popilnia - Skvyra - Volodarka - Stavyshche
- P19: Fastiv - Mytnytsya - Obukhiv - Rzhyshchiv
- P20: Tyazum - Sniatyn - Kosiv - Stary Kuty
- P21: Dolyna - Khust; entrance to Khust
- P22: "Krasna Talivka" border checkpoint - Luhansk
- P23: Simferopol - Feodosia (Note: P23 is classified as 35K-003 by Russia. Ukraine does not recognize this designation.)
- P24: Tatariv - Kosiv - Kolomyia - Borshchiv - Kamianets-Podilskyi
- P25: Simferopol - Yevpatoria (Note: P25 is classified as 35K-004 by Russia. Ukraine does not recognize this designation.)
- P26: Ostroh - Kremenets; former P105
- P27: Sevastopol - Inkerman
- P28: Belarusian border at Vystupovychi (in Mozyr) - Ovruch - Zhytomyr; became a portion of highway M21 in 2013
- P29: Alushta - Sudak - Feodosia (Note: P29 is classified as 35K-005 by Russia. Ukraine does not recognize this designation.)
- P30: Entrance to the city of Irpin
- P31: Berdychiv - Khmilnyk - Lityn to highway M30
- P32: Kremenets - Bila Tserkva - Rzhyshchiv, entrance to the city of Bila Tservka; became a portion of highway H02 between 2006 and 2012
- P33: Vinnitsa - Turbiv - Lypovets - Haisyn - Balta - Velyka Mykhailivka to highway M16; was T-02-01 before 2012
  - P33: Reni - Orlivka - Izmail; now part of highway M15
- P34 "Romanov Highway": Yalta - Alushta (Note: P34 is classified as 35K-001 by Russia. Ukraine does not recognize this designation.)
- P35: Hrushivka - Sudak (Note: P35 is classified as 35K-006 by Russia. Ukraine does not recognize this designation.)
- P36: Nemyriv - Mohyliv-Podilskyi
- P37: Enerhodar - Vasylivka
- P38: Bohorodchany - Guta
- P39: Brody - Ternopil
- P40: Rava-Ruska - Yavoriv - Sudova Vyshnia
- P41: Ternopil bypass
- P42: Lubny - Myrhorod - Opeshnya to highway H12
- P43: M19 highway - Lanivtsi to highway H02
- P44: Sumy - Putyvl - Hlukhiv
- P45: Sumy - Krasnopillya - Bohodukhiv
- P46: Kharkiv - Okhtyrka
- P47: Kherson - Nova Kakhovka - Henichesk, entrance to "Askania Nova" nature preserve and the city of Nova Kakhovka
- P48: Kamianets-Podilskyi - Sataniv - Viitivtsi - Bilohiria
- P49: Vaskovychi - Shepetivka
- P50: Yarmolyntsi - Sataniv, entrance to Yarmolyntsi township and "Sataniv" public resort
- P51: Merefa - Lozova - Pavlohrad
  - P51: Kharkiv - Krasnohrad - Pereshchepino; became a portion of highway M18 between 2006 and 2012
- P53: Malyi Bereznyi to the "Malyi Bereznyi" border checkpoint
- P54: Krasnopilka - Bershad - Dubynove; was T-02-09 before 2013
  - P54: Mukachevo - Berehove to the "Luzhanka" border checkpoint; former T-07-10, redesignated as highway M24 in 2013
- P55: Odesa - Voznesensk - Novyi Buh
  - P55: "Vylok" border checkpoint - Vylok - Nevetlenfalu to the "Dyakovo" border checkpoint; redesignated as highway M26 in 2013
- P56: Chernihiv - Pakul - "Slavutych" checkpoint - Chernobyl, entrance to Slavutych
- P57: Oleshky - Hola Prystan - Skadovsk, entrance to Oleshok
- P58: Sevastopol - Kamyshovaya Bukhta
- P59: Entrance to sensitive sites in the city of Sevastopol
- P60: Krolevets - Konotop - Romny - Pyriatyn
- P61: Baturyn - Konotop - Sumy, entrance to "Hetman's Capital" reserve
- P62: Kryvorivnya - Ust-Putyla - Stari Kuty - Vyzhnytsia - Storozhynets - Chernivtsi
- P63: H03 highway - Vartikivtsi to the "Sokiryany" border checkpoint, entrances to the "Rososhany" and "Kelmintsi" border checkpoints
- P64: Kivshovata - Shushkivka - Lysianka - Moryntsi - Shevchenko - Tarasivka to highway M16
- P65: "Nikolaevka" border checkpoint - Semenivka - Novhorod-Siverskyi - Hlukhiv to the "Katerinovka" border checkpoint
- P66: "Demino-Oleksandrivka" border checkpoint - Svatove - Lysychansk - Luhansk
- P67: Chernihiv - Nizhyn - Pryluky - Pyriatyn, entrance to the town of Nizhyn
- P68: Talalaivka - Ichnia - Trostyanets - Sokyrnytsi to highway H07, entrance to "Kachanivka" historical and culture preserve
- P69: Kyiv - Vyshhorod - Desna - Chernihiv, entrance to Goncharivske village
- P70: Odesa - Bilhorod-Dnistrovskyi to highway M15 at Monashi, entrance to the port of Ilyichevsk; former T-16-04, redesignated as H33 in 2017
- P71: Odesa - Ivanivka - Ananyiv - Pishchana - Khashchuvate - Kolodiste - Ryzhavka to highway M05
- P72: Bilhorod-Dnistrovskyi to "Starokozache" border checkpoint; was T-16-26 before 2012
- P73: Highway H08 near Dniprovi Khvyli - Nikopol
- P74: Piatykhatky - Kryvih Rih - Shyroke; was T-04-18 before 2012
- P75: "Tymkove" border checkpoint - Slobidka - Balta - Kryve Ozero - Pervomaisk - Domanivka - Oleksandrivka; was T-16-03 before 2012
- P76: "Prykladnyky" border checkpoint - Zarichne - Dubrovytsia
- P77: Rivne - Tuchyn - Hoshcha to highway H25
- P78: Kharkiv - Zmiiv - Balakliya - Horokhovatka
- P79: Highway M18 - Sakhnovshchina - Izium - Kupyansk to the "Pisky" border checkpoint; was T-21-09 before 2012
- P80: Kamianske - Mykolayivka - Sursko-Mykhailivka - Solone - Chervonokamyane; was T-04-17 before 2015
- P81: Kazanka - Snihurivka - Antonivka to highway P47; former T-15-05, T-15-08, T-15-09, T-15-12, T-15-17 and O-150401 before 2015
- P82: Sosnytsia - Korop to highway M02; was T-25-16 before 2019
- P83: Slavutych - Liubech - Ripky - highway M01 - Horodnia - highway H28 - Snovsk - Koriukivka - Semenivka - Chaykyne to highway H27, entrance to the villages of Berezna and Brech; was T-25-12, T-25-33, T-25-37 and T-25-58 before 2019
- P84: Bibrka - Kamianka-Buzka - Zhovkva - Horodok - Mykolaiv - Zhydachiv - Kalush - Burshtyn; was T-09-10, T-14-19 and T-14-25 before 2021
- P85: Dnipro - Vasylkivka - Pokrovske - Hulyaipole - Pology - Melitopol was T-04-01 before 2023
- P86: Hukiv - Dunaivtsi - Mohyliv-Podilskyi was T-23-08 before 2023
- P87: Halych - Pidhaitsi - Sataniv; was T-09-03 before 2023

== See also ==
- Roads in Ukraine
