= Kivshovata =

Rural locality in Kyiv Oblast, Ukraine

Kivshovata Ківшовата Koshevata, Kovshevataya, Koszowata
- Village
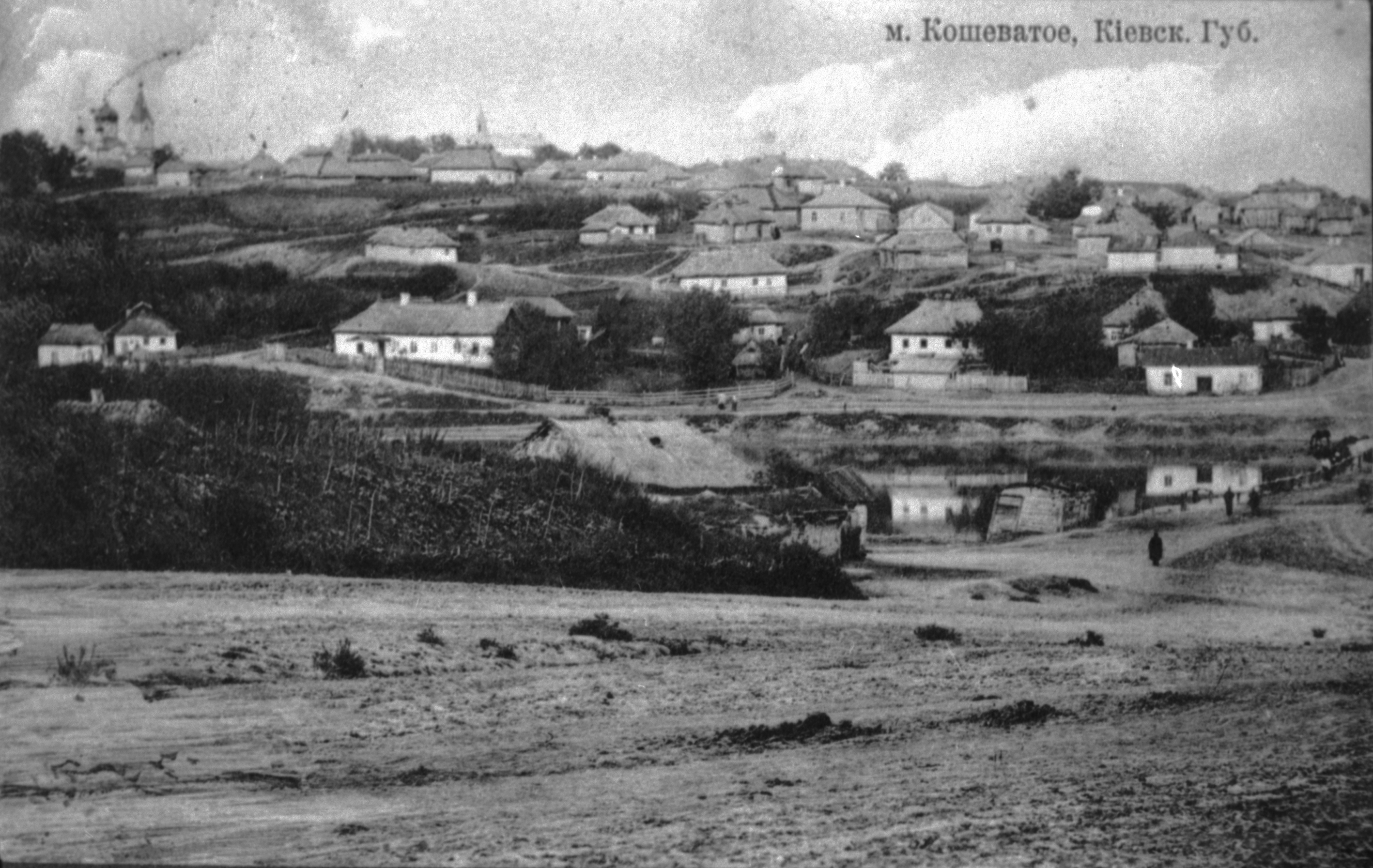
- Kivshovata in the beginning of the 20th century

- Location in Ukraine
- Coordinates: 49°29′03″N 30°37′22″E
- Country: Ukraine
- Oblast: Kyiv Oblast
- Raion: Bila Tserkva Raion
- Founded: 1560s

Kivshovata (Ukrainian: Ківшовата, Yiddish: קאָשעוואַטע, romanized: Koshevata, Russian: Ковшеватая, romanized: Kovshevataya, Polish: Koszowata, Kovshevataya, Koshevata) is a village in Bila Tserkva Raion, in Kyiv Oblast (province) in central Ukraine. It belongs to Tarashcha urban hromada, one of the hromadas of Ukraine. Kivshovata borders the village of Luka.

== History ==
The village was founded in the 1560s, with official written evidence dated to 31 May 1571 when King Sigismund Augustus confirmed property rights for the village called Kovshovatitse. It was part of the Polish–Lithuanian Commonwealth until 1793 when it became part of the Russian Empire.

Until the mid-20th century, the village had a significant Jewish community, being a shtetl. The Jewish community of Kivshovata made up 22% of the total population. The first synagogue in Kivshovata was built in the middle of the 19th century, with a second built by 1865, and there was also a kahal (Jewish community council). The last synagogue closed in 1932. Nearly the entire Jewish population of Kivshovata was murdered during the Holocaust, though some returned following the war. The Jewish cemetery, located at the northwestern outskirts of the village was destroyed during World War II with gravestones used to pave a nearby road. By the 1950s the site of the cemetery began to be used as a field for farming. It was reported that the last Jewish person in Kivshovata died in the 2010s.

Until 18 July 2020, Kivshovata belonged to Tarashcha Raion. The raion was abolished that day as part of the administrative reform of Ukraine, which reduced the number of raions of Kyiv Oblast to seven. The area of Tarashcha Raion was merged into Bila Tserkva Raion.

== See also ==
- Pale of Settlement
