= Kyslivka =

Kyslivka (Ukrainian: Кислі́вка) is the name of two villages in Ukraine:

- Kyslivka, Petropavlivka rural hromada, Kupiansk Raion, Kharkiv Oblast (founded in 1710)
- Kyslivka, Tarashcha urban hromada, Bila Tserkva Raion, Kyiv Oblast (founded in the 17th century)

== See also ==
- Kislovka — cognate Russian placename
