= Rostyslav Omeliashko =

Ukrainian folklorist, ethnographer (born 1954)

- Ростислав Андрійович Омеляшко
- Born: 18 October 1954 (age 71); Stanyslaviv, now Ivano-Frankivsk, Ivano-Frankivsk Oblast, Ukraine
- Education: Taras Shevchenko National University of Kyiv
- Occupations: Folklorist; ethnographer
- Awards: Order of Merit, 3rd class Merited Culture Worker of Ukraine; 25 Years of Independence of Ukraine Medal; Les Taniuk Prize "For the preservation of historical memory"

Rostyslav Omeliashko (Ukrainian: Ростислав Андрійович Омеляшко; born 18 October 1954) is a Ukrainian folklorist, ethnographer. Son of Andrii Omeliashko.

== Biography ==
Rostyslav Omeliashko was born on 18 October 1954, in the city of Stanyslaviv (now Ivano-Frankivsk).

He graduated from Taras Shevchenko National University of Kyiv in 1977, and completed his postgraduate studies there in 1982. From 1977 to 1988, he worked as a teacher in the village of Marianivka, Bila Tserkva Raion. Notably, he participated in the educational project of I. Kozlovskyi, which envisioned uniting the efforts of general and music schools for the comprehensive musical and aesthetic development of students. His personal contribution also included the creation and teaching of an original art course for high school students.

He began working in Ministry of Chernobyl of Ukrainein 1991, which was renamed the Ministry of Emergencies in 1996. In 2007, he was the founder and head of the State Scientific Center for the Protection of Cultural Heritage against Man-Made Disasters under the State Agency of Ukraine on Exclusion Zone Management (Kyiv), at which the Museum-Archive of the Folk Culture of the Ukrainian Polissia began operating in 2011.

=== Organizational and Programmatic Work ===
He actively participated in forming the strategy for overcoming the Chornobyl disaster, notably developing the culturological section of the National Program for Minimizing the Consequences of the Accident for the period 1993–2000. To implement this program, he engaged and coordinated the activities of fourteen different creative and scientific teams. These included specialists from specialized institutes of the National Academy of Sciences of Ukraine, universities, museum institutions, and public organizations.

In addition, he created a methodology and technique necessary for saving material objects and intangible phenomena of cultural heritage in conditions of radiation contamination.

=== Expeditionary Activity and Results ===
From 1994 to 2021, he led large-scale historical and ethnographic expeditions. Initially, these expeditions worked directly in the Exclusion Zone (from 1995 to 2005, the poet Lina Kostenko participated in this work). Beginning in 2001, their activities were expanded to other affected districts of Polissia and settlements where displaced persons were compactly residing.

With his direct involvement, 686 authentic Polissia villages and 97 resettled communities were surveyed. This colossal work yielded the following results:

- 40 diverse publications (scientific, popular science, media) were released.
- 20 exhibition displays were created.
- A unique museum and archive fund was collected, which became the basis for the holistic reconstruction and preservation of the lost ethnocultural world of Polissia.

== Awards ==
- Merited Culture Worker of Ukraine (8 February 2010);
- Order of Merit, 3rd class (22 August 2016);
- 25 Years of Independence of Ukraine Medal (19 August 2016);
- Les Taniuk Prize "For the preservation of historical memory" (2020).

== Bibliography ==
- Мельник О. Ростислав Омеляшко — сучасний Яворницький // Українська газета. 1999, 8 лип.
- Дубинянська Я. «Усі казали: так, це треба, але хто?» // Dzerkalo Tyzhnia. 2007, 17 лют.
- Яновська Л. Ростислав Омеляшко: «У Чорнобильській зоні ще багато недосліджених сіл» // Урядовий кур'єр. 2010, 15 трав.
- Аккерман Г. Пройти крізь Чорнобиль. Розділ «Пам'ять знедолених: селяни і етнографи». К., 2018.
