= Doslidnytske =

Rural locality in Kyiv Oblast, Ukraine

Doslidnytske Дослідницьке
- Rural settlement
- Flag Coat of arms

- Location of Doslidnytske in Ukraine Doslidnytske (Ukraine)
- Coordinates: 49°55′19″N 30°08′52″E
- Country: Ukraine
- Oblast: Kyiv Oblast
- Raion: Bila Tserkva Raion
- Town status: 1984

Government
  - Town Head: Anatoliy Lutsenko

Area
  - Total: 11.27 km^{2} (4.35 sq mi)

Population (2001)
  - Total: 2,167
  - Density: 192.3/km^{2} (498.0/sq mi)
- Time zone: UTC+2 (EET)
  - Summer (DST): UTC+3 (EEST)
- Postal code: 08654
- Area code: +380 4571
- Website: http://rada.gov.ua/

Doslidnytske (Ukrainian: Дослідницьке) is a rural settlement in Bila Tserkva Raion (district) of Kyiv Oblast (region) in northern Ukraine. It belongs to Hrebinky settlement hromada, one of the hromadas of Ukraine. Its population was 2,167 as of the 2001 Ukrainian Census. Current population: 1,850 (2022 estimate).

== History ==
Until 18 July 2020, Doslidnytske belonged to Vasylkiv Raion. The raion was abolished that day as part of the administrative reform of Ukraine, which reduced the number of raions of Kyiv Oblast to seven. The area of Vasylkiv Raion was split between Bila Tserkva, Fastiv, and Obukhiv Raions, with Doslidnytske being transferred to Bila Tserkva Raion.

Until 26 January 2024, Doslidnytske was designated urban-type settlement. On this day, a new law entered into force which abolished this status, and Doslidnytske became a rural settlement.

== Gallery ==
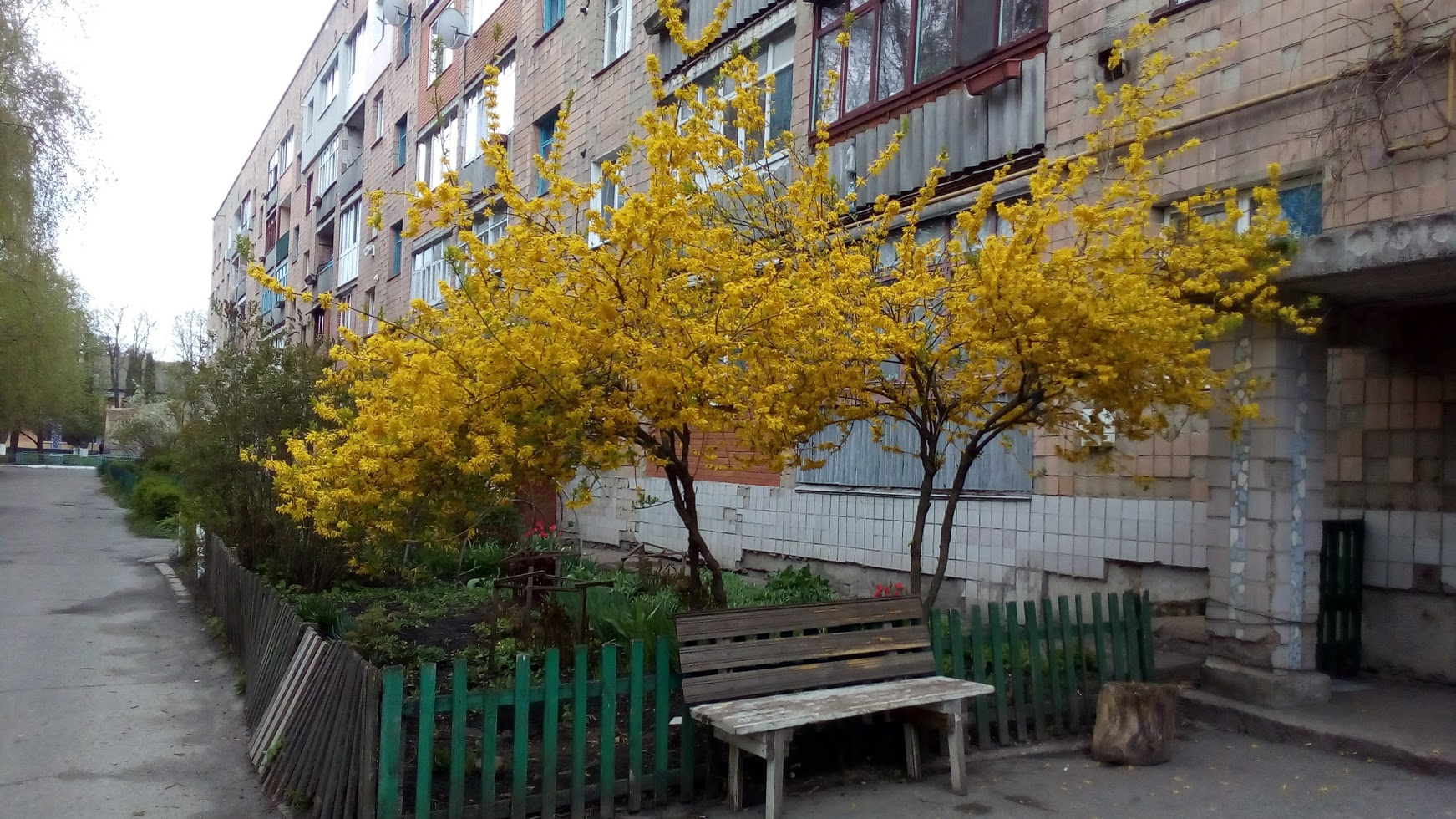
Street

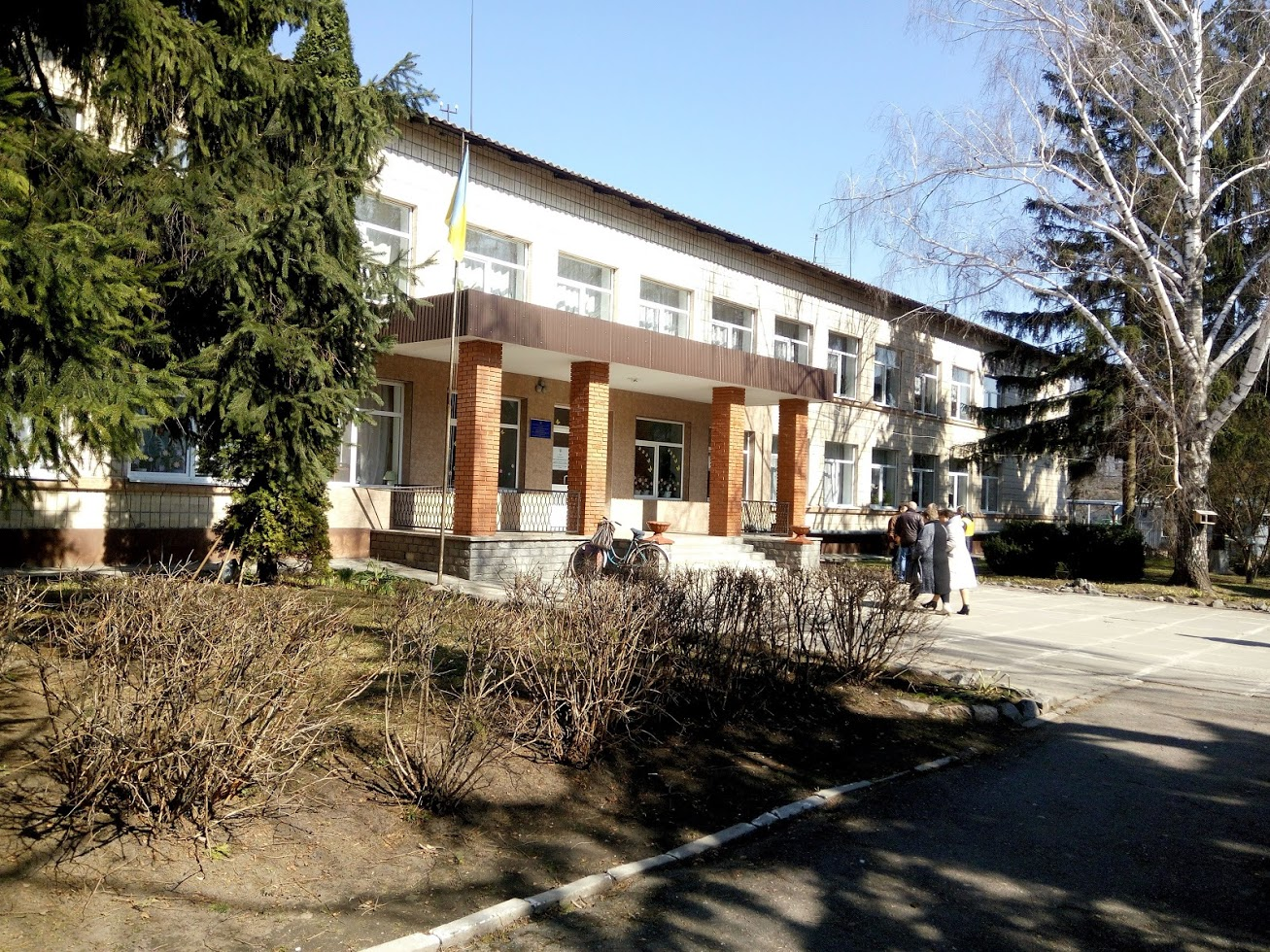
School

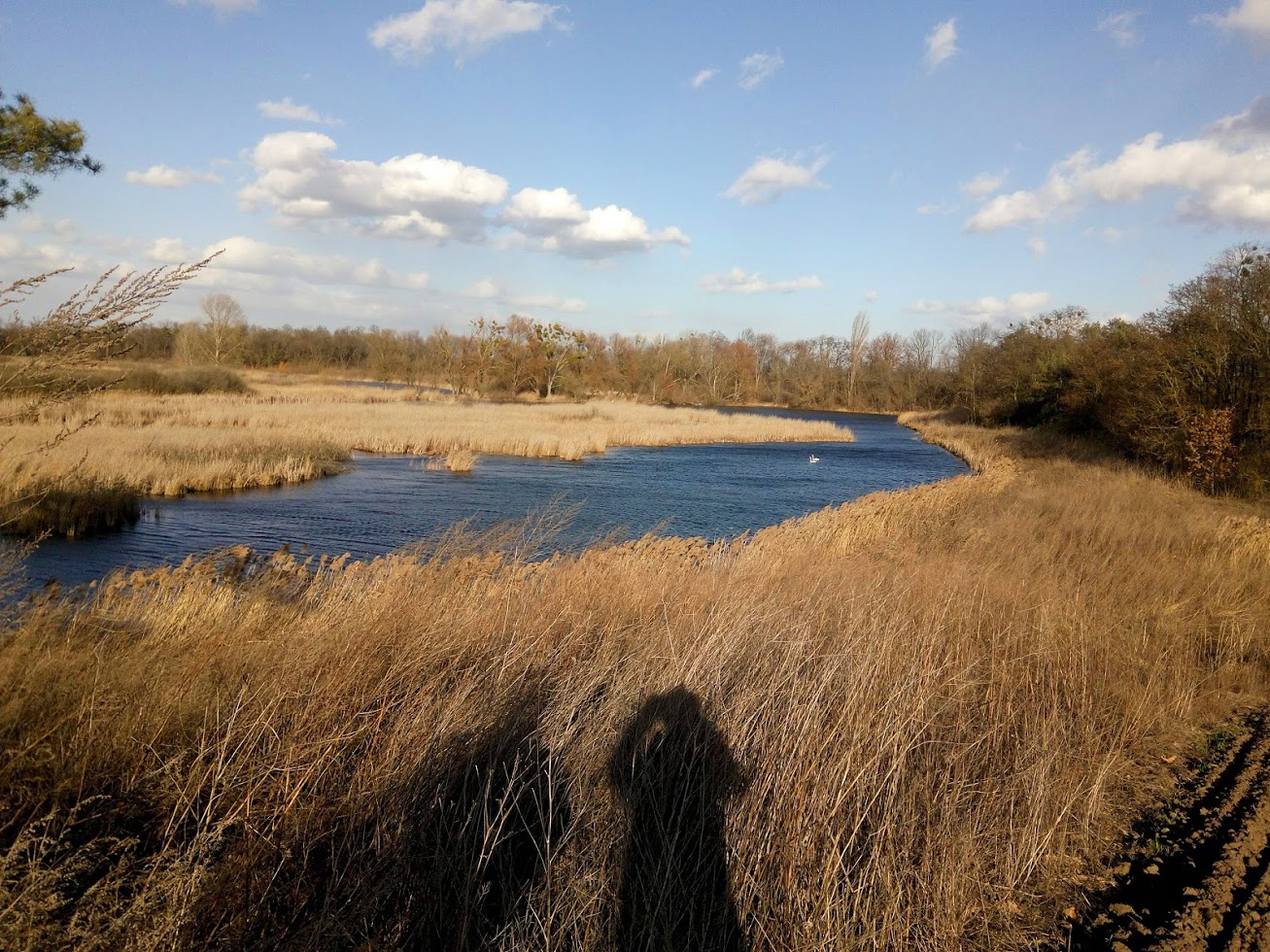
Nature around the town

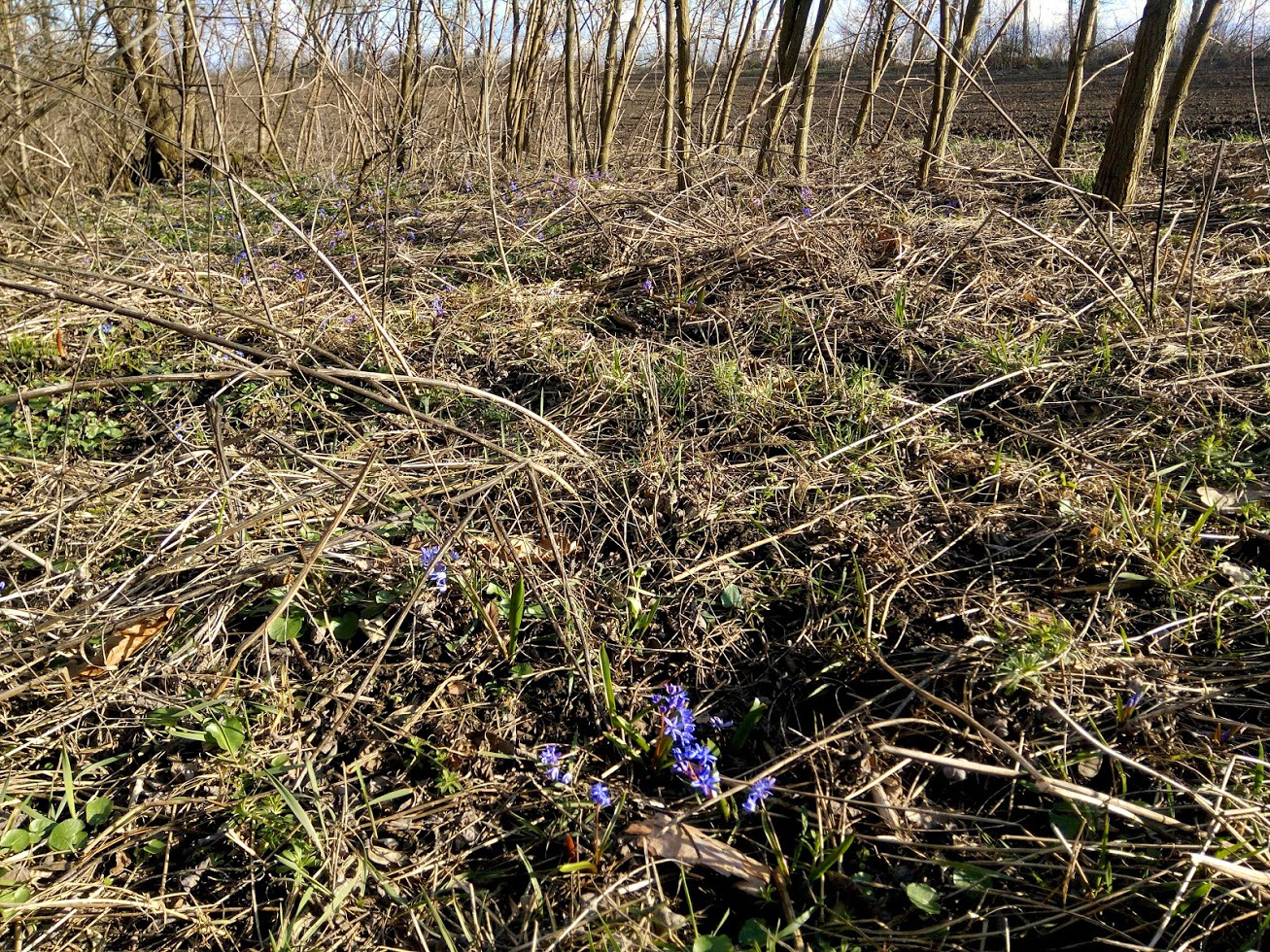
Nature around the town

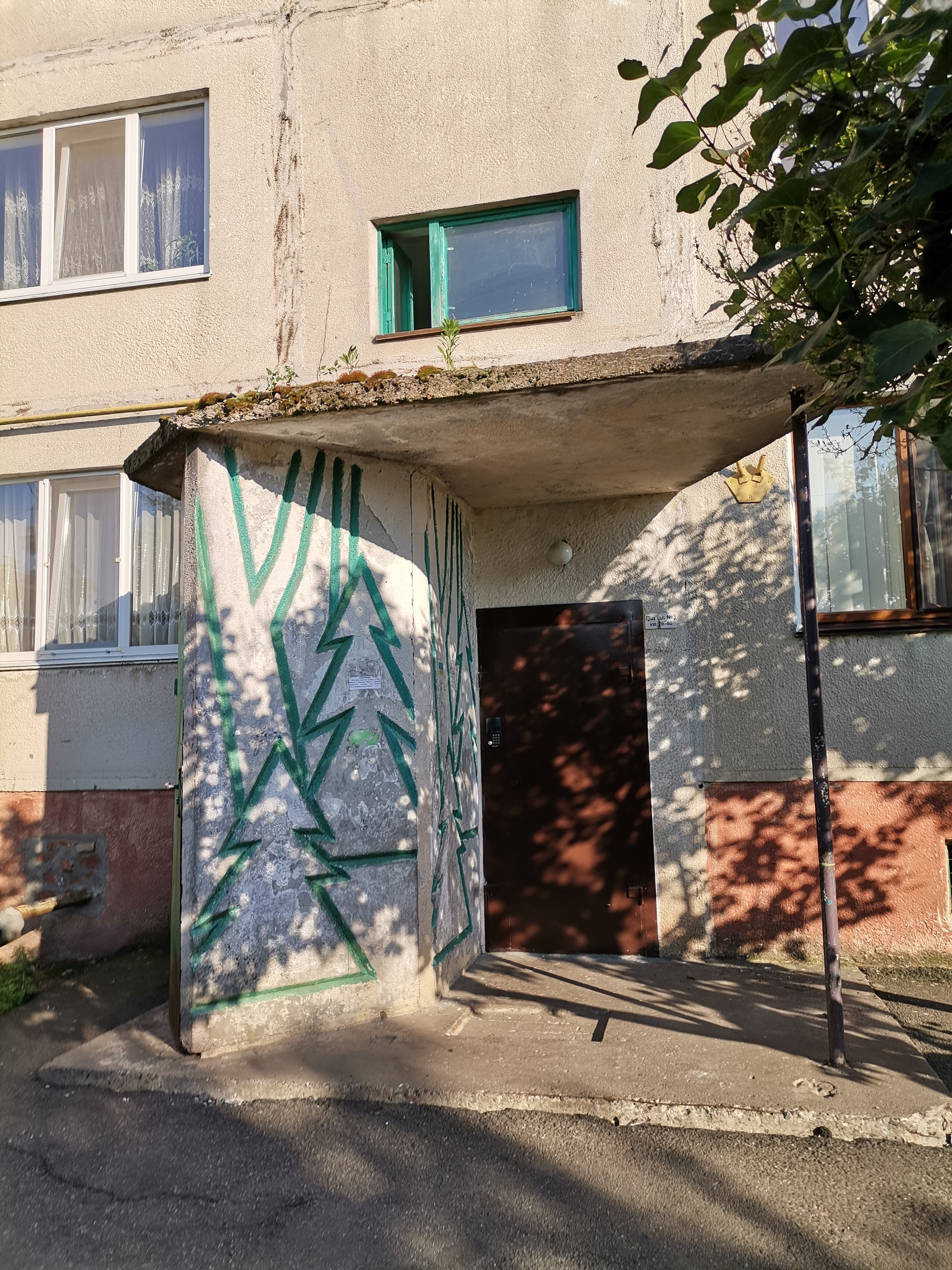
Building decore

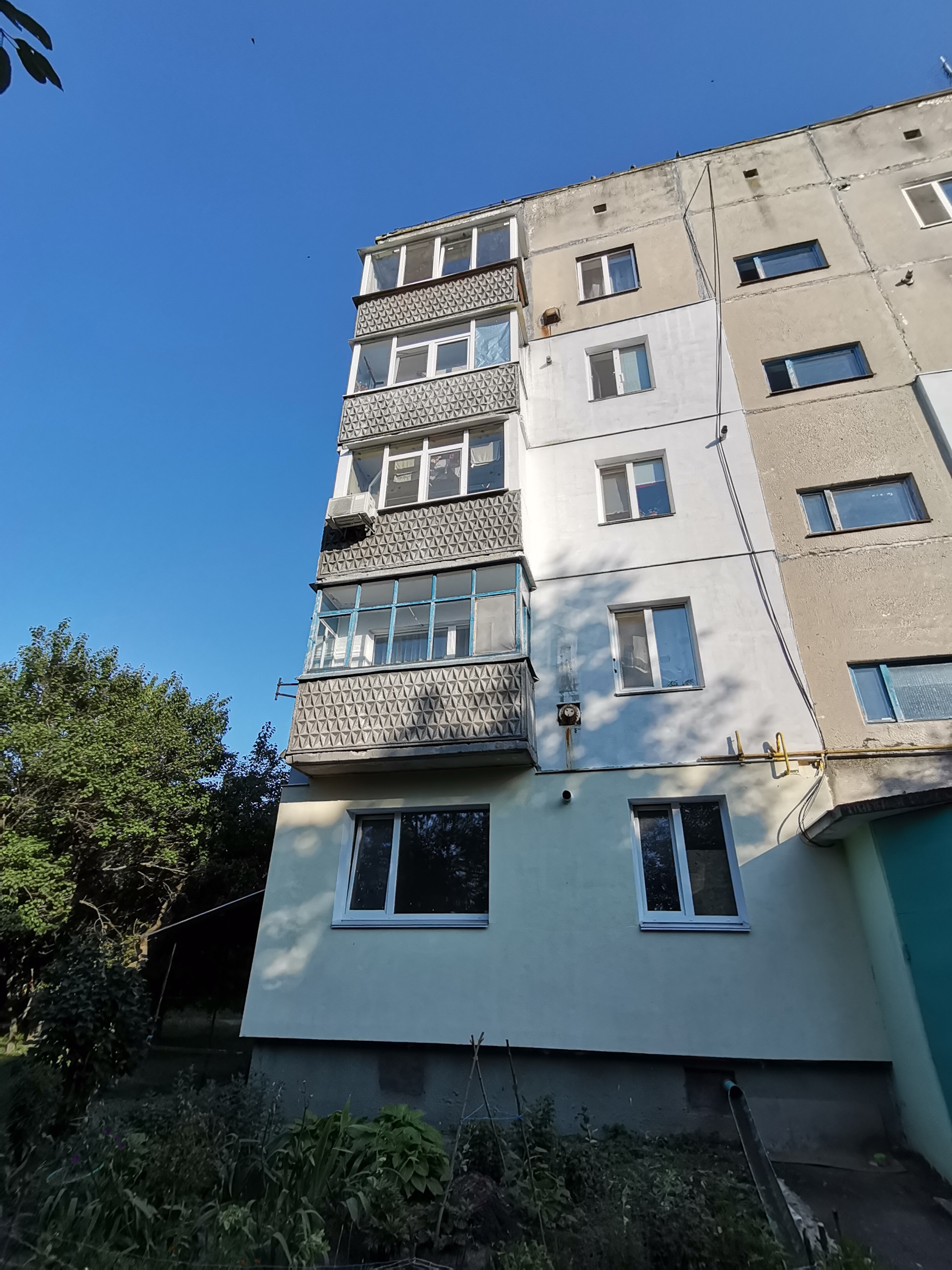
Building
