= Stavyshche =

Rural locality in Kyiv Oblast, Ukraine

Stavyshche Ставище
- Rural settlement
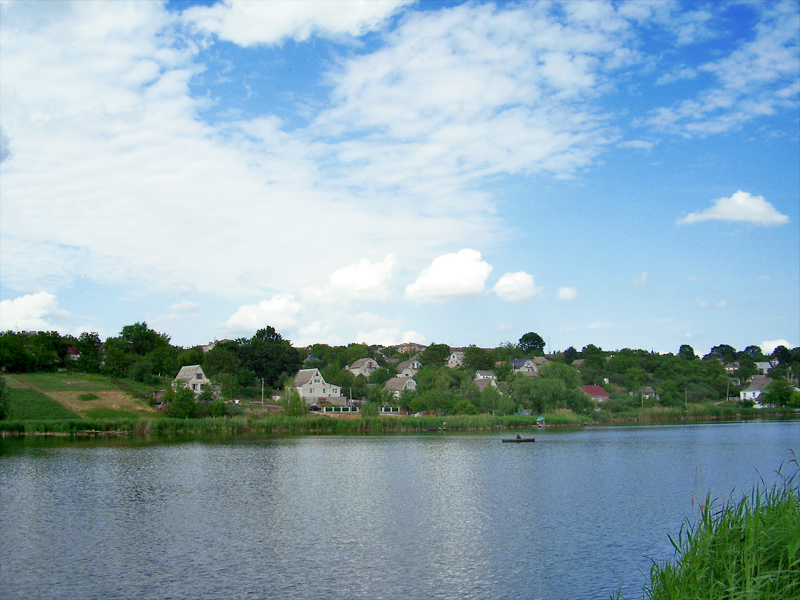
- Outskirts over Hnylyi Tikych

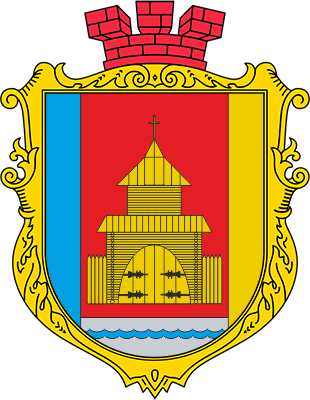
- Flag Coat of arms

- Location of Velyka Dymerka in Ukraine Stavyshche (Ukraine)
- Country: Ukraine
- Oblast: Kyiv Oblast
- Raion: Bila Tserkva Raion
- First mentioned: 1622

Population (2001)
  - Total: 7,929
- Time zone: UTC+2 (EET)
  - Summer (DST): UTC+3 (EEST)

Stavyshche (Ukrainian: Ставище, Polish: Stawiszcze) is a rural settlement in Bila Tserkva Raion, Kyiv Oblast (province) in central Ukraine, on the Hnylyi Tikych river. It hosts the administration of Stavyshche settlement hromada, one of the hromadas of Ukraine. Population: 6,056 (2022 estimate). In 2001, population was 7,929.

== History ==
At the end of the 16th century on the territory that belonged to the Bila Tserkva starosta Stanisław Lubomirski appeared a small settlement that was named as Lubomir. However, after several raids by Crimean Tatars it was razed. Only separate dwellings have survived among the local ponds. Note, the word stav in both Polish and Ukrainian languages means a pond, while suffix -shche (-shcha) means a geographic area, land. At the beginning of the 17th century the village of Stavyshche is mentioned in a list of the Ruzinski's domain. It is the first recorded mentioning of its existence. In 1622 it is already mentioned as one of villages of magnate Chodkiewicz in Kiev Voivodeship and was relieved of all taxes due its impoverishment by suffering from raids by Crimean Tatars and permanent stationing in the area of the Polish Royal troops. In 1635 Stavyshche was mentioned already as a town that had defensive fortifications and military garrison. It was granted the rights of Magdeburg law, according to which the local craftsmen were joining in crafts shops.

The town joined the Khmelnytsky Uprising of 1648-54. Just before the uprising one of Khmelnytskyi's envoys Yarema Konchevskyi who arrived to the town was reassured by its residents that the city's guns will not cause harm to the insurgents. It became a company (hundred) center of Bila Tserkva Regiment. In 1655 Bohdan Khmelnytsky engaged the Polish-Tatars army in battle at Stavyshche.

A decade later the town was the center of the Varenytsia Uprising. Its inhabitants did not accept the town’s return to Polish rule (1667) and rebelled repeatedly in the course of the next century (1702—04, 1730s, 1750s). With the partition of Poland in 1793, Stavyshche was annexed by Russia, and became part of Tarashcha county in the Kiev Governorate.

In the 19th century it acquired a distillery, flour mill, and brick factory. By 1900 its population had reached 8,500. Today the town has a construction company and a food industry.

Until 18 July 2020, Stavyshche was the administrative center of Stavyshche Raion. The raion was abolished that day as part of the administrative reform of Ukraine, which reduced the number of raions of Kyiv Oblast to seven. The area of Stavyshche Raion was merged into Bila Tserkva Raion.

Until 26 January 2024, Stavyshche was designated urban-type settlement. On this day, a new law entered into force which abolished this status, and Stavyshche became a rural settlement.

== Notable people ==
- Mykola Melnyk, a Chernobyl hero helicopter pilot, was born and grew up in Stavyshche.
- Anatoliy Zlenko, Soviet and Ukrainian diplomat
- Maksym Slavinsky, Ukrainian diplomat
- Nina Preobrazhenskaya, Soviet rower
- Avraham Herzfeld, an Israeli politician and Zionist activist
