= Terezino =

Terezino can refer to:

- Terezino Polje, a village in Croatia,
- Terezyne (Terezino), an urban-type settlement in Kyiv Oblast of Ukraine
