= Mezhove =

Mezhove may refer to several places in Ukraine:

- Mezhove, Crimea
- Mezhove (urban-type settlement), Donetsk Oblast
- Mezhove (village), Donetsk Oblast
- Mezhove, Dnipropetrovsk Oblast
- Mezhove, Kirovohrad Oblast
- Mezhove, Kyiv Oblast
