= P64 road (Ukraine) =

Road in Ukraine

Road P64 (Ukraine)
- Автошлях Р64 (Ukraine)
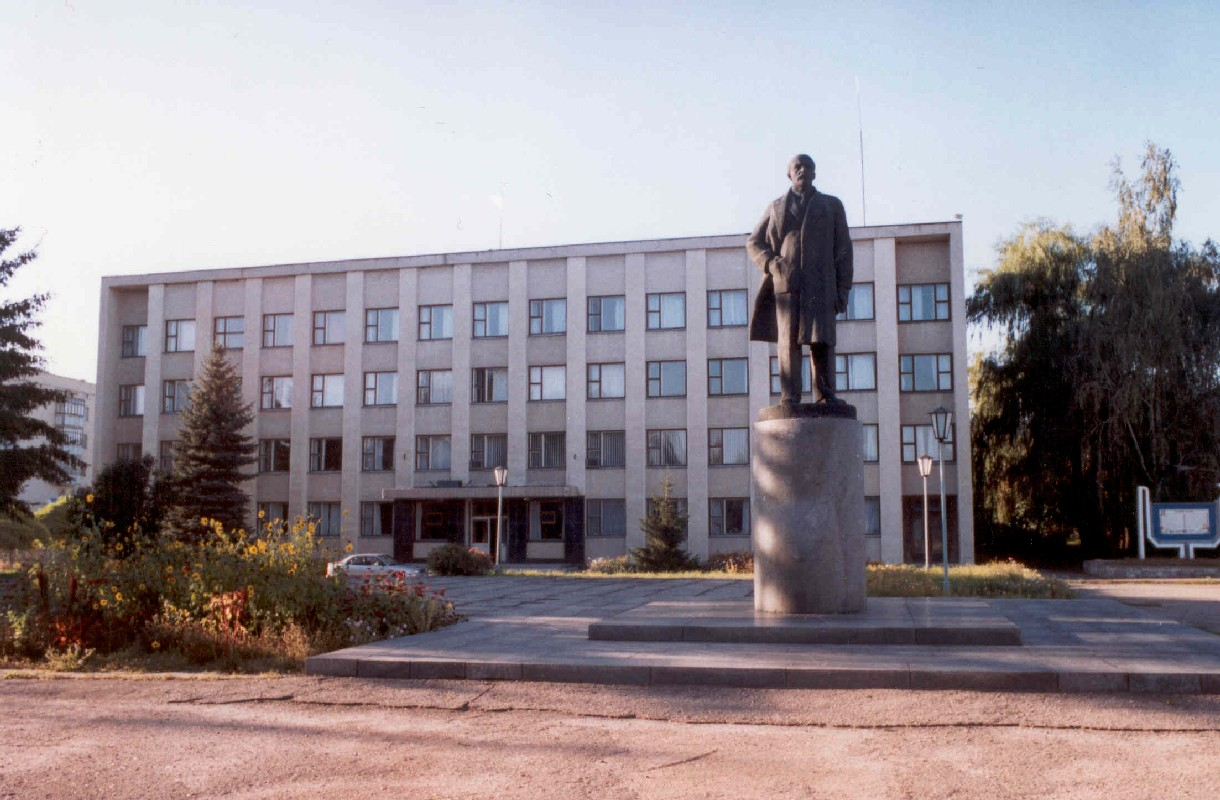
- P 64 at Peace Square in Lysyanka

Route information
- Length: 81.3 km (50.5 mi)

Major junctions
- North end: P 04 in Kivshovata
- South end: H 16 in Tarasivka

Location
- Country: Ukraine
- Oblasts: Kyiv, Cherkasy

Highway system
- Roads in Ukraine; State Highways

Road P 64 is a motor road of regional significance in Ukraine. Passes through the territory of the Kyiv and Cherkasy regions.

== Whole length ==
The total length of the road, Kivshovata – Lysianka – Moryntsi – Tarasivka – H 16, is 81.3 kilometres (50.5 mi).

== Main route ==
Route map P 64:

Route P64
Kyiv Oblast
Bila Tserkva Raion
Kivshovata	P 04	0 kilometres (0 mi)
Great Berezanka		
Veselyi Kut		
Kosyakovka		
Cherkasy Oblast
Zvenyhorodka Raion
Sushkovka		
Chaplinka		
Boyarka		
Pisarevka		
intersection with	P 04	
Lysianka	T-2403	
Pochapintsy	T-2408	
Moryntsi		
Champamya		
Shevchenkovo	T-2410	
Tarasivka		
intersection with	H 16	81.3 kilometres (50.5 mi)
