= P64 =

P64 may refer to:

== Aviation ==
- Boulton & Paul P.64 Mailplane, a British transport biplane
- Kirksville Air Force Station, a closed United States Air Force radar station
- North American P-64, an American fighter aircraft
- Partenavia P.64 Oscar, an Italian light aircraft

== Vessels ==
- HMS Vandal (P64), a submarine of the Royal Navy
- INS Karmuk (P64), a corvette of the Indian Navy
- LÉ George Bernard Shaw (P64), an offshore patrol vessel of the Irish Naval Service

== Other uses ==
- FB P-64, a Polish semi-automatic pistol
- Magdalen papyrus, a biblical manuscript
- P64 road (Ukraine)
- P64, a state regional road in Latvia
- P-64 (mountain lion), a mountain lion that lived in Los Angeles and Ventura counties
- P6_{4}, three-dimensional space group number 172
