= Rokytne Raion, Kyiv Oblast =

Former subdivision of Kyiv Oblast, Ukraine

Rokytne Raion Рокитнянський район
- Raion
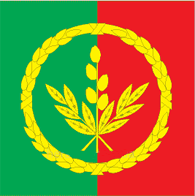
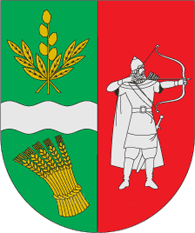
- Flag Coat of arms

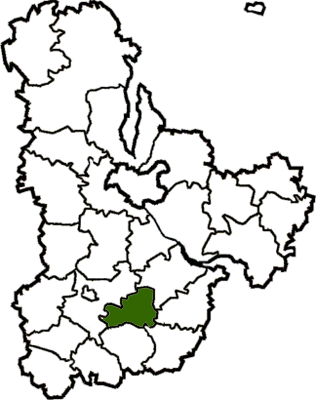
- Coordinates: 49°42′6″N 30°31′12″E
- Country: Ukraine
- Region: Kyiv Oblast
- Disestablished: 18 July 2020
- Admin. center: Rokytne
- Subdivisions: List: — city councils; — settlement councils; — rural councils; Number of localities: — cities; — urban-type settlements; 22 — villages; — rural settlements

Population (2020)
  - Total: 25,729
- Time zone: UTC+02:00 (EET)
  - Summer (DST): UTC+03:00 (EEST)
- Area code: +380

Rokytne Raion (Ukrainian: Рокитнянський район) was a raion (district) in Kyiv Oblast of Ukraine. Its administrative center was the urban-type settlement of Rokytne. The raion was abolished on 18 July 2020 as part of the administrative reform of Ukraine, which reduced the number of raions of Kyiv Oblast to seven. The area of Rokytne Raion was merged into Bila Tserkva Raion. The last estimate of the raion population was 25,729 (2020 est.)

At the time of disestablishment, the raion consisted of one hromada, Rokytne settlement hromada with the administration in Rokytne.
