= Uzyn urban hromada =

Uzyn urban hromada Узинська міська громада
- Hromada
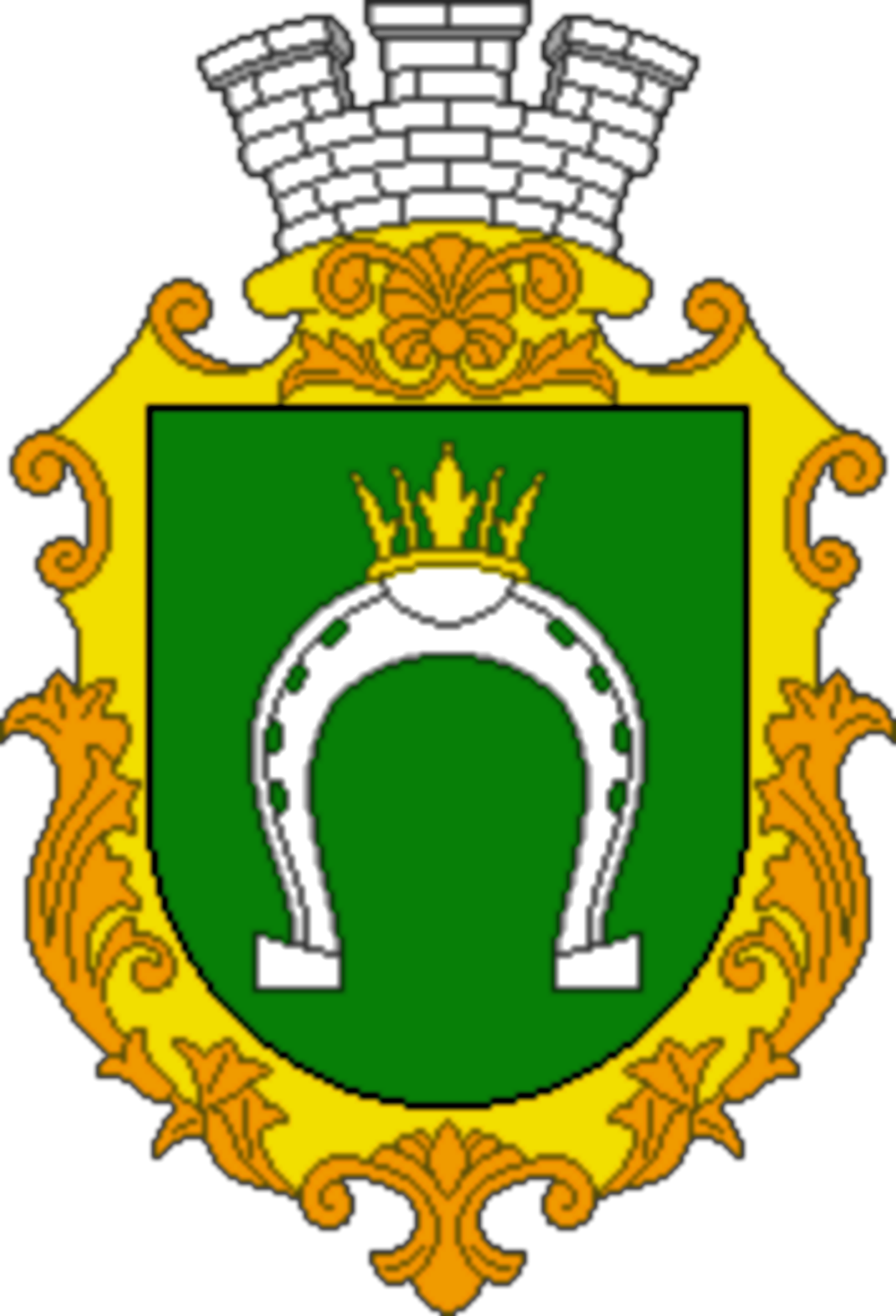
- Seal
- Interactive map of Uzyn urban hromada
- Country: Ukraine
- Oblast: Kyiv
- Raion: Bila Tserkva

Area
  - Total: 407.9 km^{2} (157.5 sq mi)

Population (2020)
  - Total: 20,245
  - Density: 49.63/km^{2} (128.5/sq mi)
- Settlements: 20
- Cities: 1
- Villages: 19

Uzyn urban hromada (Ukrainian: Узинська міська громада) is a hromada of Ukraine, located in Bila Tserkva Raion, Kyiv Oblast. Its administrative center is the city Uzyn.

It has an area of 407.9 square kilometres (157.5 mi^{2}) and a population of 20,245, as of 2020.

The hromada contains 20 settlements: 1 city (Uzyn), and 19 villages:

- Bloshchyntsi
- Vasyliv
- Verbova
- Zatysha
- Ivanivka
- Yosypivka
- Krasne
- Liudvynivka
- Makiivka
- Mala Antonivka
- Mykhailivka
- Oliinykova Sloboda
- Ostriiky
- Pavlivka
- Rozaliivka
- Stepok
- Sukholisy
- Tarasivka
- Chepyliivka

== See also ==
- List of hromadas of Ukraine
