= Fursy rural hromada =

Fursy rural hromada Фурсівська селищна громада
- Hromada
- Interactive map of Fursy rural hromada
- Country: Ukraine
- Oblast: Kyiv Oblast
- Raion: Bila Tserkva Raion

Area
  - Total: 277.8 km^{2} (107.3 sq mi)

Population (2020)
  - Total: 10,729
  - Density: 38.62/km^{2} (100.0/sq mi)
- Settlements: 11
- Villages: 11

Fursy rural hromada (Ukrainian: Фурсівська селищна громада) is a hromada of Ukraine, located in Bila Tserkva Raion, Kyiv Oblast. Its administrative center is the village of Fursy.

It has an area of 277.8 square kilometres (107.3 mi^{2}) and a population of 10,729, as of 2020.

The hromada contains 11 settlements, which are all villages:

- Andriivka
- Bezuhliaky
- Velykopolovetske
- Mala Mykhailivka
- Mala Skvyrka
- Matiushi
- Pyshchyky
- Trushky
- Fursy
- Chmyrivka
- Yablunivka

== See also ==
- List of hromadas of Ukraine
