= Skvyra urban hromada =

Skvyra urban hromada Сквирська міська громада
- Hromada
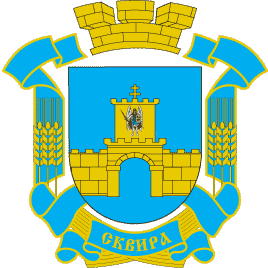
- Seal
- Interactive map of Skvyra urban hromada
- Country: Ukraine
- Oblast: Kyiv
- Raion: Bila Tserkva

Area
  - Total: 873.0 km^{2} (337.1 sq mi)

Population (2020)
  - Total: 31,695
  - Density: 36.31/km^{2} (94.03/sq mi)
- Settlements: 45
- Cities: 1
- Villages: 44

Skvyra urban hromada (Ukrainian: Сквирська міська громада) is a hromada of Ukraine, located in Bila Tserkva Raion, Kyiv Oblast. Its administrative center is the city Skvyra.

It has an area of 873.0 square kilometres (337.1 mi^{2}) and a population of 31,695, as of 2020.

The hromada contains 45 settlements: 1 city (Skvyra), and 44 villages:

- Antoniv
- Bezpechna
- Buky
- Velyki Yerchyky
- Vladyslavka
- Horobiivka
- Domantivka
- Dulytske
- Dunaika
- Zolotukha
- Kalenna
- Kamiana Hreblia
- Kvitneve
- Kononivka
- Krasnolisy
- Krasnianka
- Kryvoshyintsi
- Lavryky
- Mali Yerchyky
- Mali Lysivtsi
- Mynkivtsi
- Movchanivka
- Nova Pustovarivka
- Novyi Shliakh
- Orikhovets
- Pustovarivka
- Rybchyntsi
- Rohizna
- Ruda
- Savran
- Samhorodok
- Selezenivka
- Taboriv
- Tarasivka
- Tereshky
- Tokarivka
- Tkhorivka
- Ulianivka
- Tsapiivka
- Chubyntsi
- Shaliivka
- Shamraiivka
- Shapiivka
- Yamy

== See also ==
- List of hromadas of Ukraine
