= Medvyn rural hromada =

Medvyn rural hromada Медвинська селищна громада
- Hromada
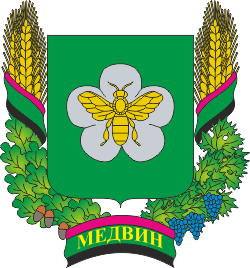
- Seal
- Interactive map of Medvyn rural hromada
- Country: Ukraine
- Oblast: Kyiv
- Raion: Bila Tserkva

Area
  - Total: 231.4 km^{2} (89.3 sq mi)

Population (2020)
  - Total: 5,511
  - Density: 23.82/km^{2} (61.68/sq mi)
- Settlements: 12
- Villages: 12

Medvyn rural hromada (Ukrainian: Медвинська селищна громада) is a hromada of Ukraine, located in Bila Tserkva Raion, Kyiv Oblast. Its administrative center is the village of Medvyn.

It has an area of 231.4 square kilometres (89.3 mi^{2}) and a population of 5,511, as of 2020.

The hromada contains 12 settlements, which are all villages:

- Medvyn
- Brane Pole
- Huta
- Dibrivka
- Dmytrenky
- Zakutyntsi
- Koriakivka
- Krasnohorodka
- Mytaivka
- Poberezhka
- Sofiika
- Shcherbashyntsi

== See also ==
- List of hromadas of Ukraine
