= Skvyra =

City in Kyiv Oblast, Ukraine

Skvyra Сквира
- City
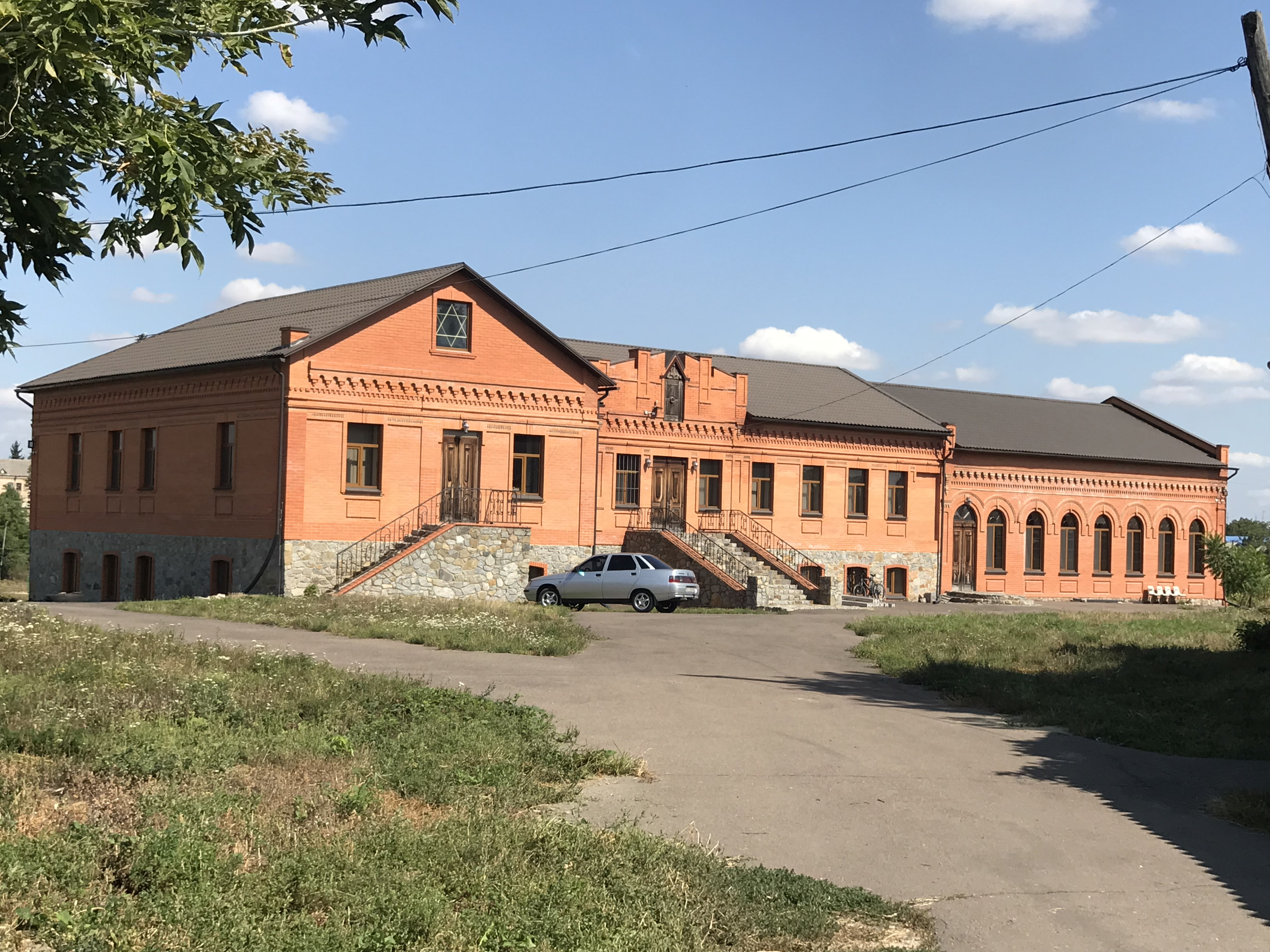
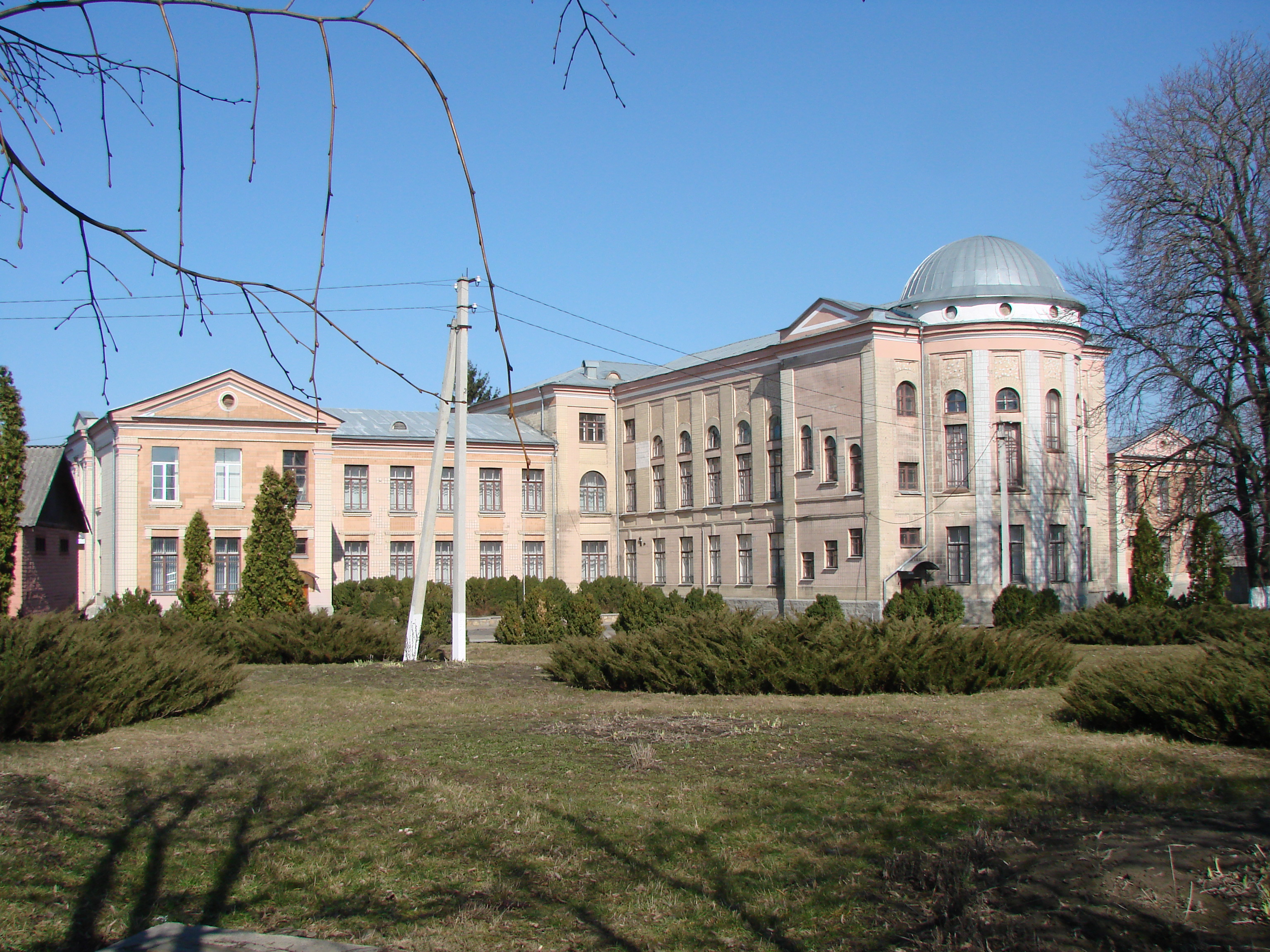
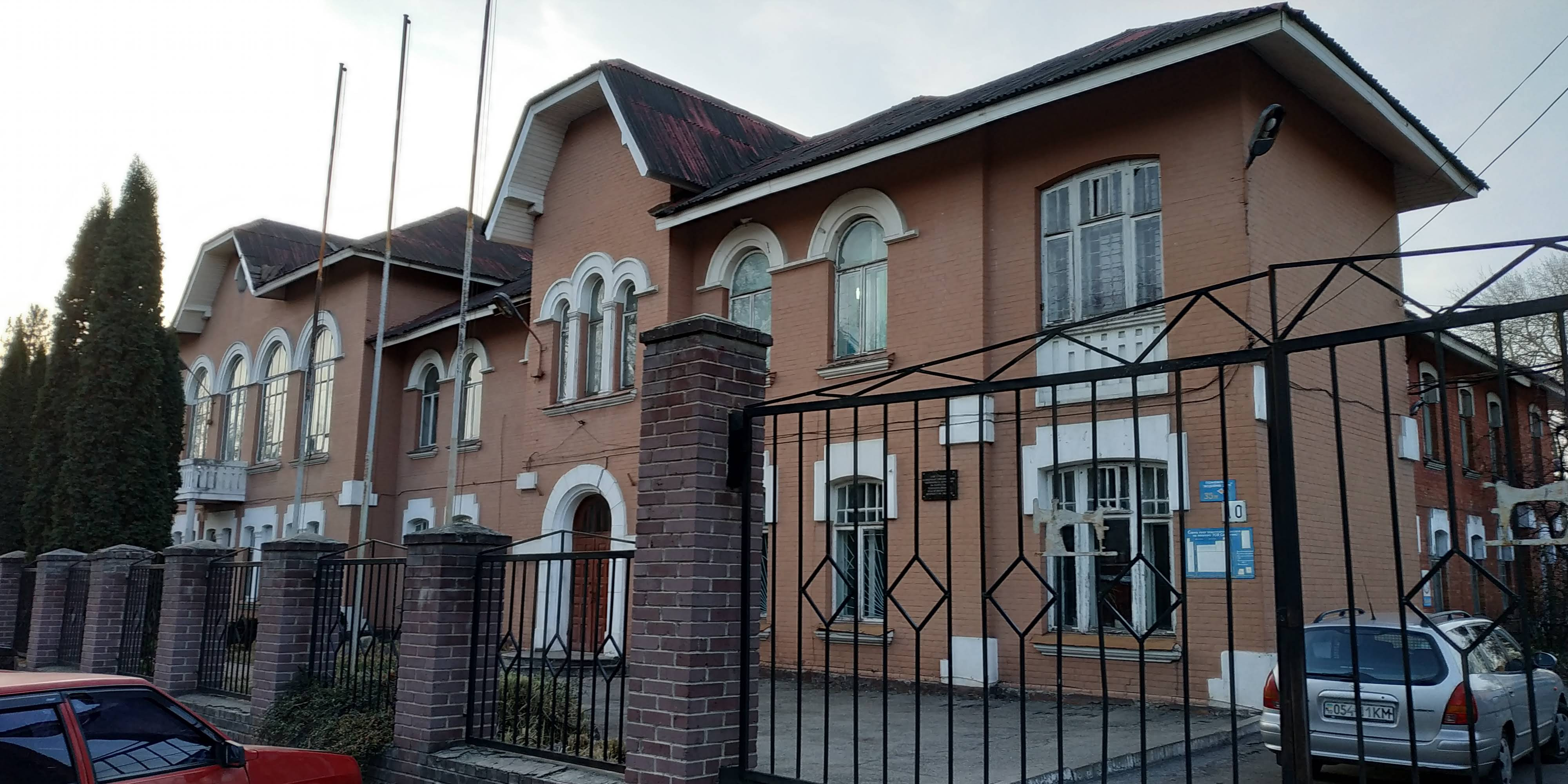
- Top left: Synagogue; top right: Building of Men's Gymnasium; bottom: Zemstvo Administration Building

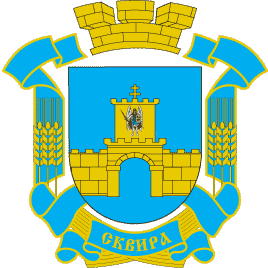
- Coat of arms
- Interactive map of Skvyra
- Location of Skvyra Skvyra (Ukraine)
- Coordinates: 49°43′0″N 29°40′0″E
- Country: Ukraine
- Oblast: Kyiv Oblast
- Raion: Bila Tserkva Raion
- Hromada: Skvyra urban hromada
- Founded: no data (XI - XIV century)
- Magdeburg Rights: 1791
- First mention: 1390

Government
  - Mayor: Valentyna Levitska

Area
  - Total: 63.28 km^{2} (24.43 sq mi)

Population (2022)
  - Total: 15,165
- Postal code: 09000
- Area code: +380 4568

Skvyra (Ukrainian: Сквира, IPA: [ˈskwɪrɐ]) is a city in Bila Tserkva Raion, Kyiv Oblast (region) of central Ukraine. Skvyra has an area of 6,328 km^{2} (2,443 sq mi). It hosts the administration of Skvyra urban hromada, one of the hromadas of Ukraine. Its population is approximately 15,165 (2022 estimate).

== Name ==
In addition to the Ukrainian Сквира (Skvyra), the name of the city in Yiddish is Skver, סקווער.

== History ==
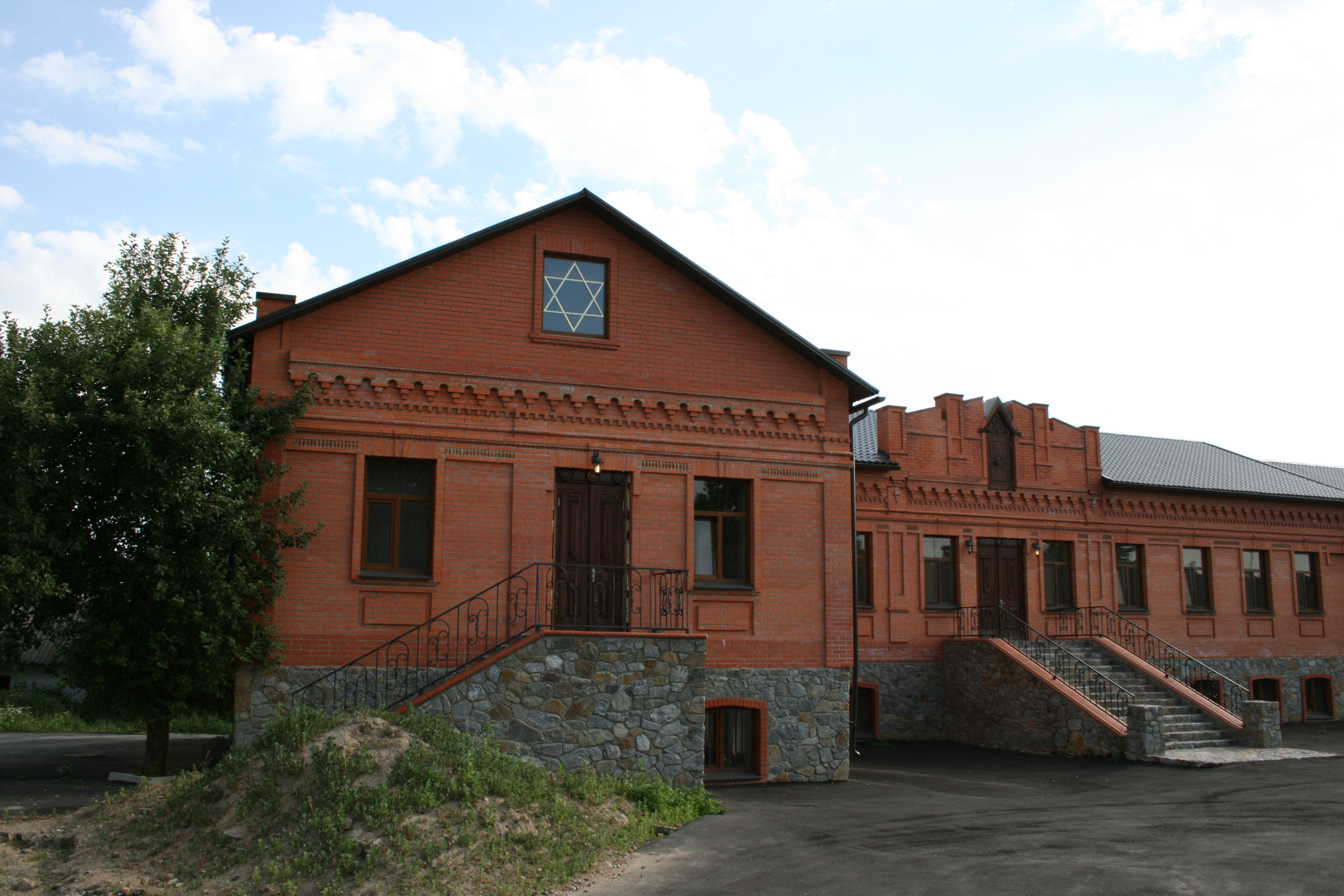
The Skver synagogue in Skvyra, which was restored in 2004

The ancient town of Skvyra was completely destroyed at the end of the 16th century. In 1736, Skvyra was mentioned as a village (selo) leased by a Jewish lessee. According to the census of 1765, there were 124 houses in Skvyra, 51 of which belonged to Jews. In 1775, 116 Jews lived in Skvyra, in 1784 there were 204, and in 1787, 144.

After Skvyra was included in the Pale of Settlement the town's Jewish community increased. Its Jewish population was 2,184 in 1847 and grew to 8,910 in 1897 — 49.5% of the general population. At the end of the 19th century Skvyra had seven synagogues, a parochial school, a hospital, a pharmacist and a district doctor. Many Jews were engaged in grain and timber export. By 1910 the town had a Talmud Torah, a Jewish private boys’ school and two private girls’ schools.

There were two pogroms in the town in 1917 and a wave of six pogroms in 1919, some of which lasted for several weeks. There were rapes, houses were burnt down, and Jewish property was seized and destroyed or sold to local peasants. 191 people were killed and hundreds injured. After the pogroms an epidemic in the town killed up to 30 people a day. The Jewish population fled to Kyiv, Odesa and Bila Tserkva.

Under the Soviet Union the religious and communal life of the Jews of Skvyra was dissolved. The town's Jewish population fell to 4,681 by 1926 (about 33.6% of the population) and 2,243 by 1939, but even so it remained among the biggest Jewish communities of Ukraine at that time.

In World War II German forces occupied the town in September 1941. For a time the Sonderkommando headquarters was in Skvyra. On 20 September 1941, 850 Jews were shot in Skvyra. A few days later, over 140 more were executed. According to the head of Skvyra's Jewish community, there were mass shootings of Jews in the area of the market, the secondary school and in Bannaya Street. Skyvra's remaining Jewish population was about 1,000 after the War and fell to about 500 by 1960. It has continued to decline, and in 2009 numbered about 120.

Until 18 July 2020, Skvyra was the administrative center of Skvyra Raion. The raion was abolished that day as part of the administrative reform of Ukraine, which reduced the number of raions of Kyiv Oblast to seven. The area of Skvyra Raion was merged into Bila Tserkva Raion.

== Population ==
=== Language ===
Distribution of the population by native language according to the 2001 census:

Language	Percentage
Ukrainian	97.62%
Russian	1.9%
other/undecided	0.48%

== Skver Hasidim and New Square ==
The Twersky Skver Hasidic dynasty line emanating from Skvyra eventually settled in the United States where part of the community founded their own incorporated village called New Square (Skvyra being called "Skver" in Yiddish) in Rockland County, New York. In 2004 the Skvyra synagogue and the tzaddik’s court, now a hotel for Hasidic visitors, were restored.

== Notable people ==
- Asher Ginzberg (better known by his pen name Ahad Ha'am), writer and publicist, founder of Cultural Zionism, was born in the city.
- Rustam Khudzhamov, Ukrainian goalkeeper
- David Margulis ( David son of Lev/ Leyba Margulis), Hero of the Soviet Union. He was born on March 10, 1914, in Skvira, Kyiv gubernia.

== See also ==
- History of the Jews in Ukraine
- Skver (Hasidic dynasty)
