= Marianivka, Bila Tserkva Raion, Kyiv Oblast =

Rural locality in Kyiv Oblast, Ukraine

Marianivka Маріанівка
- Village
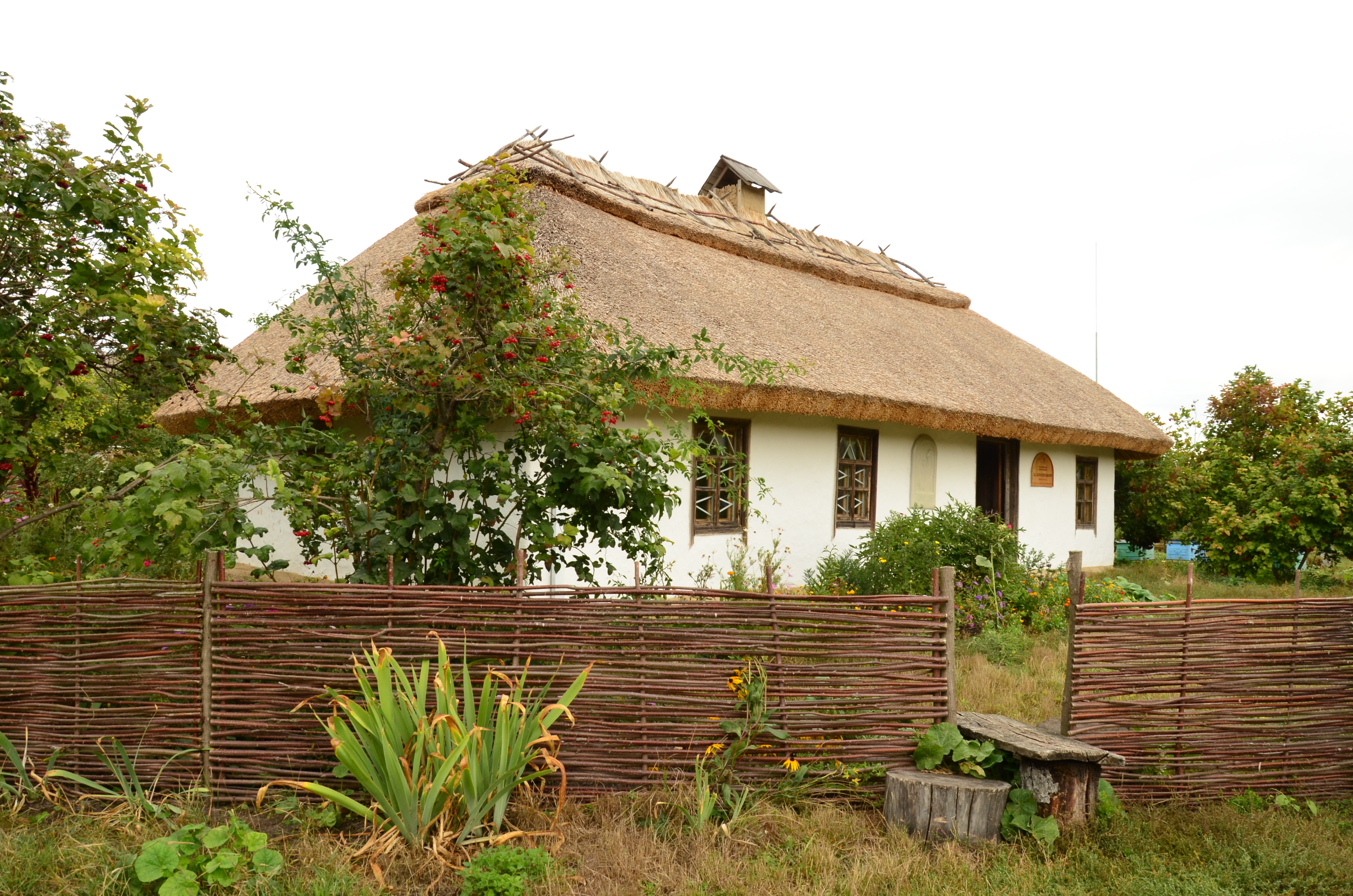
- House of Ivan Kozlovsky in Marianivka

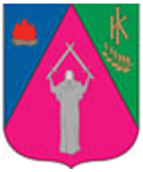
- Coat of arms

- Location of Marianivka Marianivka (Ukraine)
- Coordinates: 50.0613°N 30.1657°E
- Country: Ukraine
- Oblast: Kyiv Oblast
- Raion: Bila Tserkva Raion

Population (2001)
  - Total: 1,017
- Postal code: 08650
- Area code: +380 4571
- Climate: Cfa

Marianivka (Ukrainian: Маріанівка) is a village in Bila Tserkva Raion, Kyiv Oblast of central Ukraine. It belongs to Kovalivka rural hromada, one of the hromadas of Ukraine.

Marianivka is known for being the birthplace of Ivan Kozlovsky. It has a music school built by him in 1970.

== History ==
Village Mar'yanivka was founded in the 12th century. The first inhabitants settled on the flow of the river Ros’ - Rotok. Previously, Ros’ was Rotok tributary run through the modern village Marianivka. From year to year Rotok became shallow and turned into a swamp. On the south-west of the village Marianivka there was a fortified town Perep'yatyha.

It was a stone wall fence around the town. There was a high castle of Prince and Princess Perep'yata and Perep'yatyha (her name was Marianna). Many centuries ago Prince Perep'yat left Kyiv with his army to far places. During two years there were no news from him, so the princess thought the prince was killed in some battle, and she bored very much. However, disturbing news was spread about approaching unknown big army to Kyiv. Princess decided to go with her own small army toward that threatening army. At dawn two military camps near Fastov came and started fighting. There was dense fog. Two armies fought invincible until the sun rose. The first sunlight fell on the killed Prince Perepyat. The battle was stopped; Perepyatyha cried, and her soldiers in despair surrounded her. She drew the sword and fell dead next to her husband. They were buried together. There are two graves that were named - Perepyat and Perepyatyha (newspaper «Shlyah Illicha» No. 30 (332) for 1964.)

Memory of them survived to our days through the name of the graves that are near Marianivka. There are about 54 tombs around Marianivka and 53 tombs near Fastivets. However the highest of them is Perepyatyha and less - Varenska. These graves show the brutal fighting that took place in those areas. Due to frequent battles city Perep'yatyha was destroyed.

In literacy Andrew Bogolyubskii from Pechersk monastery also mentioned about the tombs of Perep'yat and Perep'yatyha. Around Marianivka there is the largest number of graves. Therefore, there is no doubt that Marianivka (named in honor of Princess Mariana Perepyatyha) was settled many centuries ago and had another name.

In 1774 Bila Tserkva, like other old Russian cities, was presented to the Polish king, and he distributed them to his lords. City Bila Tserkva and surrounding lands of 100 thousand people have been donated to Xavier Branicki. In the middle of the nineteenth century these lands were divided among children of Xavier - Alexander, Vladislav and Konstantin. Branicki had lands in possession of Vasylkiv, Kanev, Zvenigorod, Cherkasy, Radomysh areas. Dimensions possessions: Alexander - 28,076 dessiatinas, Vladislav - 131,583 tithing, Constantine - tithes 47,326 TOTAL - 206,985 tithing. The audit report of villagers (males) showed 40,740 people. Orthodox (Ukrainian) population of Marianivka was assigned to the parish in Xavier village and Catholic (Polish) population - to the parish in Motovilovka. In the second half of the 18th century there were people of Orthodox – 1,177 and Catholics - 117. Later, ownership of the city Bila Tserkva in Kyiv region referred to Countess Alexandra Branicki. She had 99 estates, managed by her relatives. Branicki often sold lands to Polish people that came and inhabited close to each other. This way was organized a settlement that was named second Marianivka. Village Marianivka was a private possession of Polish Countess Yastrubovski, and at that time the village had more than 568 yards and 3,009 inhabitants.

Marianivka was previously located in Vasylkiv Raion. The raion was abolished that day as part of the administrative reform of Ukraine, which reduced the number of raions of Kyiv Oblast to seven. The area of Vasylkiv Raion was split between Bila Tserkva, Fastiv, and Obukhiv Raions, with Marianivka being transferred to Bila Tserkva Raion.
