= Hrebinky =

Rural locality in Kyiv Oblast, Ukraine

Hrebinky Гребінки
- Rural settlement
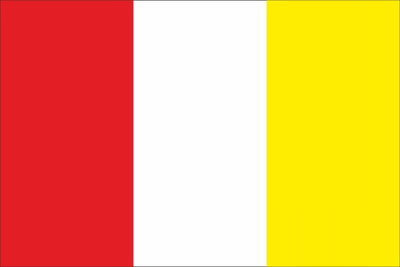
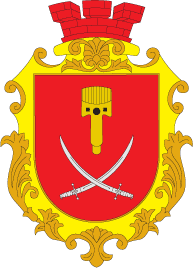
- Flag Coat of arms

- Location of Hrebinky in Ukraine Hrebinky (Ukraine)
- Coordinates: 49°57′23″N 30°10′17″E
- Country: Ukraine
- Oblast: Kyiv Oblast
- Raion: Bila Tserkva Raion
- Founded: 1612
- Town status: 1958

Government
  - Town Head: Ihor Tromsa

Area
  - Total: 13.52 km^{2} (5.22 sq mi)

Population (2001)
  - Total: 6,993
  - Density: 517.2/km^{2} (1,340/sq mi)
- Time zone: UTC+2 (EET)
  - Summer (DST): UTC+3 (EEST)
- Postal code: 08662
- Area code: +380 4571
- Website: http://hrebinky.org.ua/

Hrebinky (Ukrainian: Гребінки) is a rural settlement in Bila Tserkva Raion (district) of Kyiv Oblast (region) in northern Ukraine, in the historical Porossia region. It hosts the administration of Hrebinky settlement hromada, one of the hromadas of Ukraine. Its population is 6,993 as of the 2001 Ukrainian Census. Current population: 5,678 (2022 estimate).

== History ==
Hrebinky was founded in 1612 as a village, and it retained its village status until it was upgraded to that of an urban-type settlement in 1958. During Soviet times a sugar factory was active in Hrebinky.

Until 18 July 2020, Hrebinky belonged to Vasylkiv Raion. The raion was abolished that day as part of the administrative reform of Ukraine, which reduced the number of raions of Kyiv Oblast to seven. The area of Vasylkiv Raion was split between Bila Tserkva, Fastiv, and Obukhiv Raions, with Hrebinky being transferred to Bila Tserkva Raion. On 26 January 2024, a new law entered into force which abolished the status of urban-type settlement, and Hrebinky became a rural settlement.

== Transportation ==
The M05 highway, connecting the nation's capital Kyiv and the southern city of Odesa, passes through the town.
