= Uzyn =

City in Kyiv Oblast, Ukraine

Uzyn Узин
- City
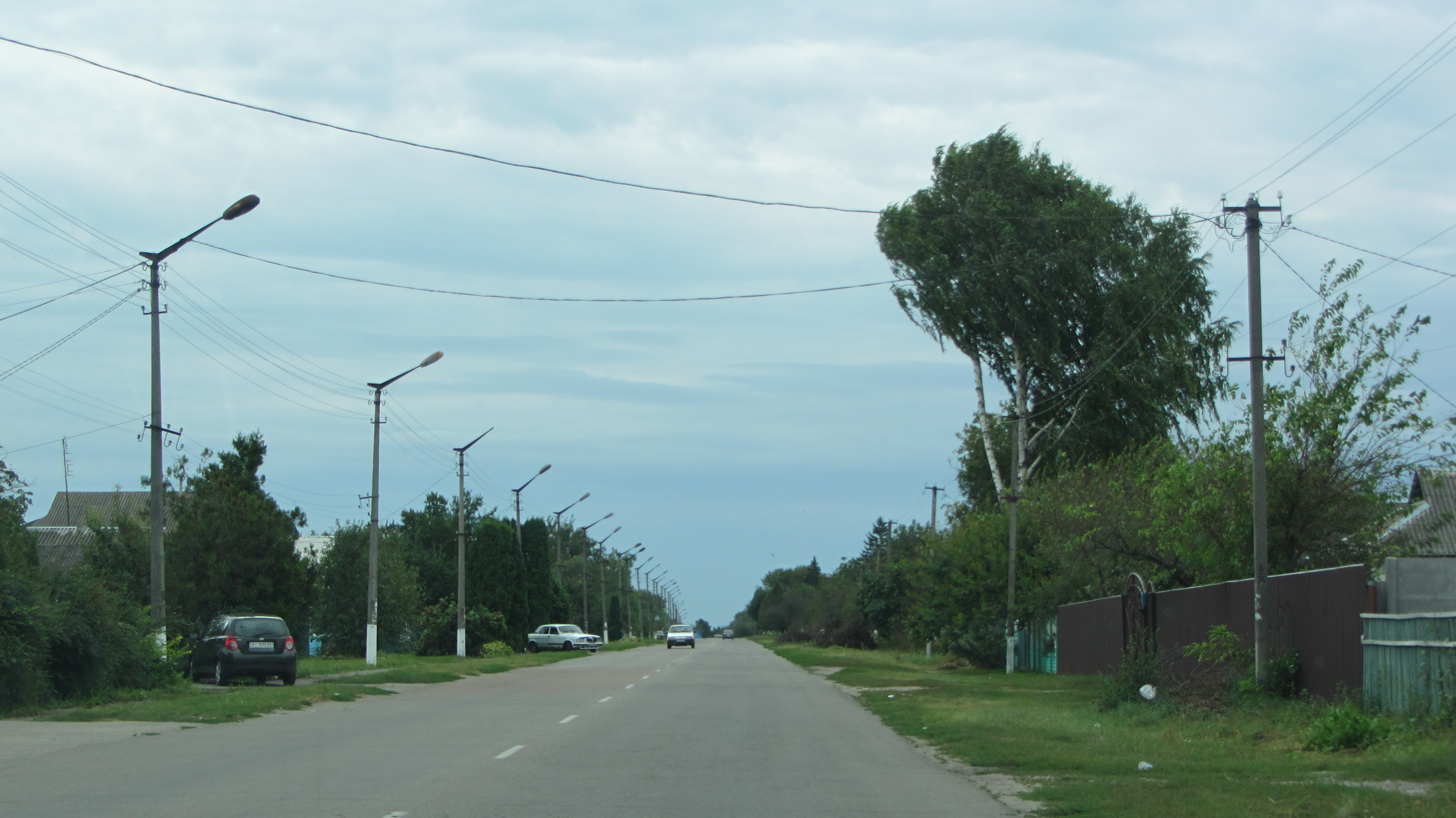
- A street in Uzyn

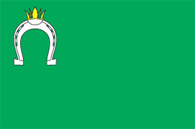
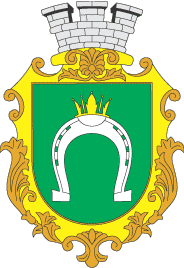
- Flag Coat of arms
- Interactive map of Uzyn
- Location of Uzyn Uzyn (Kyiv Oblast)
- Coordinates: 49°49′27″N 30°26′33″E
- Country: Ukraine
- Oblast: Kyiv Oblast
- Raion: Bila Tserkva Raion
- Hromada: Uzyn urban hromada
- First mentioned: 1590
- City rights: August 25, 1971

Area
  - Total: 67 km^{2} (26 sq mi)

Population (2022)
  - Total: 11,921
- Postal code: 09161-09163
- Area code: +380 4563

Uzyn (Ukrainian: Узин, IPA: [ʊˈzɪn]) is a city in Bila Tserkva Raion of Kyiv Oblast (province) in central Ukraine. It hosts the administration of Uzyn urban hromada, one of the hromadas of Ukraine. The city and covers an area of 67 km^{2} (26 sq mi). Population: 11,921 (2022 estimate).

The largest industrial organisations within Uzyn are sugar plant (7% of Ukraine's sugar production), as well as a tinning factory. There is also Uzyn (air base) of the Ukrainian Air Forces.

== History ==
Uzyn was first mentioned in the year 1590 under the name Uzenytsia, and later as Tenbershchyna. Since the end of the 18th century, the city carries its current name. From 1923 to 1930, the city served as the raion centre of the Bila Tserkva Okrug. In 1956, Uzyn received the status of an urban-type settlement, and in 1971, the status of a city.

== Demographics ==
The population of Uzyn is currently 11,935 (as of 2021):

- 1975 - 16,000 inhabitants
- 2004 - 12,759 inhabitants
- 2005 - 12,628 inhabitants
- 2006 - 12,588 inhabitants
- 2011 - 12,166 inhabitants
- 2021 - 11,935 inhabitants

== Notable people ==
- Pavel Popovich (1930–2009), a Soviet cosmonaut of Ukrainian descent, the first ethnic Ukrainian to fly in space.

== Links ==
- UZYN Project - the relevance site.
