= Mezhove, Kyiv Oblast =

Village in Kyiv Oblast, Ukraine

Mezhove Межове
- Village
- Location of Mezhove within Kyiv Oblast#Location of Mezhove within Ukraine Mezhove (Ukraine)
- Coordinates: 49°36′26″N 30°06′11″E
- Country: Ukraine
- Oblast: Kyiv Oblast
- Raion: Bila Tserkva Raion
- Elevation: 193 m (633 ft)

Population (2001)
  - Total: 299
- Time zone: UTC+2 (EET)
  - Summer (DST): UTC+3 (EEST)
- Postal code: 09183
- Area code: +380 4563

Mezhove (Ukrainian: Межове) is a village in Bila Tserkva Raion, Kyiv Oblast, central Ukraine. Until 1967, Mezhove bore the name Khutir Mezhovyi.
