= Bila Tserkva urban hromada =

Bila Tserkva urban hromada Білоцерківська міська громада
- Hromada
- Seal
- Interactive map of Bila Tserkva urban hromada
- Country: Ukraine
- Oblast: Kyiv Oblast
- Raion: Bila Tserkva Raion

Area
  - Total: 394.4 km^{2} (152.3 sq mi)

Population (2020)
  - Total: 218,981
  - Density: 555.2/km^{2} (1,438/sq mi)
- Settlements: 17
- Cities: 1
- Villages: 15
- Towns: 1

Bila Tserkva urban hromada (Ukrainian: Білоцерківська міська громада) is a hromada of Ukraine, located in Bila Tserkva Raion, Kyiv Oblast. Its administrative center is the city Bila Tserkva.

It has an area of 394.4 square kilometres (152.3 mi^{2}) and a population of 218,981, as of 2020.

The hromada contains 17 settlements: 1 city (Bila Tserkva), 1 rural settlement (Terezyne), and 15 villages:

- Vilna Tarasivka
- Volodymyrivka
- Haiok
- Hlybochka
- Hlushky
- Horodyshche
- Drozdy
- Mazepyntsi
- Pylypcha
- Pishchana
- Sydory
- Skrebyshi
- Tomylivka
- Khrapachi
- Shkarivka

== See also ==
- List of hromadas of Ukraine
