= Hrebinky settlement hromada =

Hrebinky settlement hromada Гребінківська селищна громада
- Hromada
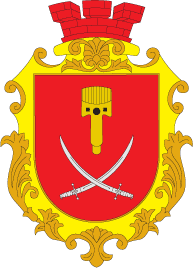
- Seal
- Interactive map of Hrebinky settlement hromada
- Country: Ukraine
- Oblast: Kyiv Oblast
- Raion: Bila Tserkva Raion

Area
  - Total: 260.2 km^{2} (100.5 sq mi)

Population (2020)
  - Total: 13,565
  - Density: 52.13/km^{2} (135.0/sq mi)
- Settlements: 12
- Villages: 10
- Towns: 2

Hrebinky settlement hromada (Ukrainian: Гребінківська селищна громада) is a hromada of Ukraine, located in Bila Tserkva Raion, Kyiv Oblast. Its administrative center is the town of Hrebinky.

It has an area of 260.2 square kilometres (100.5 mi^{2}) and a population of 13,565, as of 2020.

The hromada includes 12 settlements: 2 rural settlements (Hrebinky and Doslidnytske), and 10 villages:

- Vilshanska Novoselytsia
- Ksaverivka
- Ksaverivka Druha
- Losiatyn
- Petrivka
- Pinchuky
- Salyvonky
- Sokolivka
- Stepanivka
- Trostynska Novoselytsia

== See also ==
- List of hromadas of Ukraine
