= Rokytne, Kyiv Oblast =

Rural locality in Kyiv Oblast, Ukraine

Rokytne Рокитне
- Rural settlement
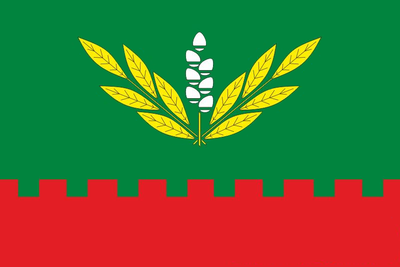
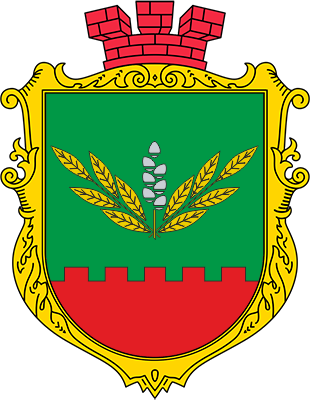
- Flag Coat of arms

- Location within Kyiv Oblast Location within Ukraine
- Coordinates: 49.689708°N 30.475111°E
- Country: Ukraine
- Oblast: Kyiv Oblast
- Raion: Bila Tserkva Raion

Population
  - Estimate (2022): 10,395
- Time zone: UTC+2 (EET)
  - Summer (DST): UTC+3 (EEST)

Rokytne (Ukrainian: Рокитне) is a rural settlement located on the Ros River in Bila Tserkva Raion, Kyiv Oblast (region) of Ukraine. It hosts the administration of Rokytne settlement hromada, one of the hromadas of Ukraine. Population: 10,395 (2022 estimate). In 2001, population was 13,790.

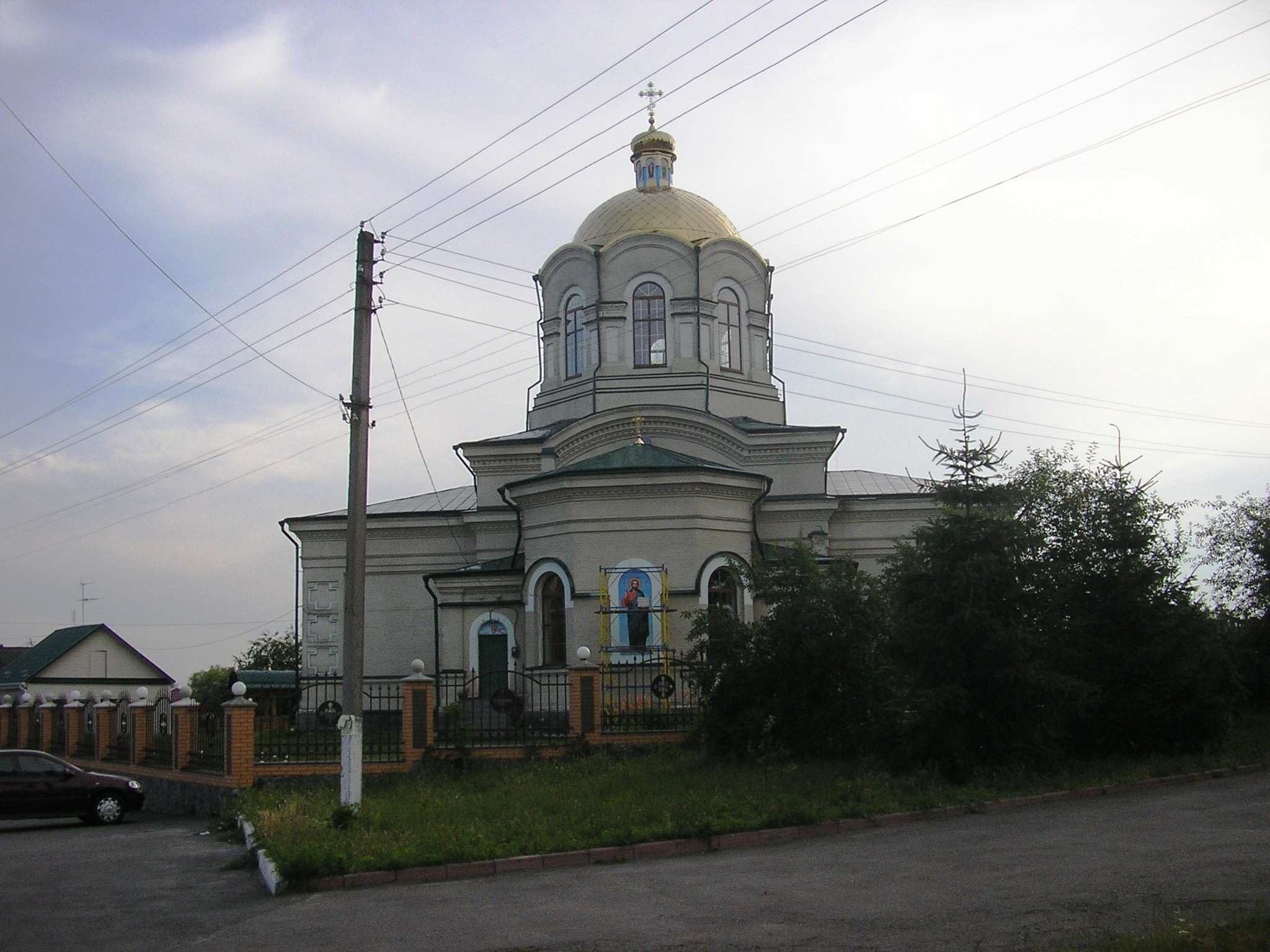
Church in Rokytne

== History ==
Until 18 July 2020, Rokytne was the administrative center of Rokytne Raion. The raion was abolished that day as part of the administrative reform of Ukraine, which reduced the number of raions of Kyiv Oblast to seven. The area of Rokytne Raion was merged into Bila Tserkva Raion.

Until 26 January 2024, Rokytne was designated urban-type settlement. On this day, a new law entered into force which abolished this status, and Rokytne became a rural settlement.
