= Maksym Slavinsky =

Ukrainian journalist and politician (1868–1945)

Maksym Slavinsky (also as Slavynsky Ukrainian: Макси́м Анто́нович Слави́нський; Russian: Макси́м Анто́нович Слави́нский; 12 August 1868 in Stavyshche, Kiev Governorate – 23 November 1945 in Kiev) was a Ukrainian journalist, political and public figure, diplomat and statesman. He was an editor of many newspapers of liberal and pro-Ukrainian disposition in the Russian Empire. In 1918 Slavinsky was appointed as Minister of Labor of the Ukrainian People's Republic, serving in the position for less than a month.

Born in the Ukrainian town of Stavyshche of the Kiev Governorate, Slavinsky graduated from the Second Kiev Gymnasium. During his student years he was a member of the Kiev literary club "Pleyada" where along with Lesya Ukrainka he translated the poetry of Heinrich Heine ("Book of songs").
