= Kovalivka rural hromada =

Kovalivka rural hromada Ковалівська селищна громада
- Hromada
- Interactive map of Kovalivka rural hromada
- Country: Ukraine
- Oblast: Kyiv
- Raion: Bila Tserkva

Area
  - Total: 231.6 km^{2} (89.4 sq mi)

Population (2020)
  - Total: 6,566
  - Density: 28.35/km^{2} (73.43/sq mi)
- Settlements: 9
- Villages: 9

Kovalivka rural hromada (Ukrainian: Ковалівська селищна громада) is a hromada of Ukraine, located in Bila Tserkva Raion, Kyiv Oblast. Its administrative center is the village of Kovalivka.

It has an area of 231.6 square kilometres (89.4 mi^{2}) and a population of 6,566, as of 2020.

The hromada contains 9 settlements, which are all villages:

- Kovalivka
- Vinnytski Stavy
- Kyshchyntsi
- Marianivka
- Palianychyntsi
- Polohy
- Pshenychne
- Ustymivka
- Chervone

== See also ==
- List of hromadas of Ukraine
