= Mala Vilshanka rural hromada =

Mala Vilshanka rural hromada Маловільшанська селищна громада
- Hromada
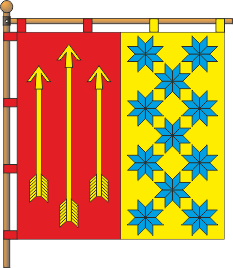
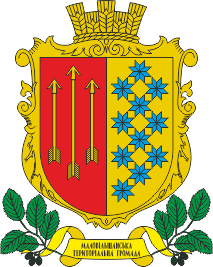
- Flag Seal
- Interactive map of Mala Vilshanka rural hromada
- Country: Ukraine
- Oblast: Kyiv
- Raion: Bila Tserkva

Area
  - Total: 362.9 km^{2} (140.1 sq mi)

Population (2020)
  - Total: 10,636
  - Density: 29.31/km^{2} (75.91/sq mi)
- Settlements: 21
- Villages: 21

Mala Vilshanka rural hromada (Ukrainian: Маловільшанська селищна громада) is a hromada of Ukraine, located in Bila Tserkva Raion, Kyiv Oblast. Its administrative center is the village of Mala Vilshanka.

It has an area of 362.9 square kilometres (140.1 mi^{2}) and a population of 10,636, as of 2020.

The hromada contains 21 settlements, which are all villages:

- Mala Vilshanka
- Bakaly
- Bykova Hreblia
- Haiok
- Klochky
- Kozhenyky
- Korzhivka
- Mezhove
- Odnorih
- Ozerna
- Popravka
- Potiivka
- Sorokotiahy
- Tadiivka
- Tarasivka
- Fastivka
- Fesiury
- Cherkas
- Cherkas
- Chupyra
- Shcherbaky

== See also ==
- List of hromadas of Ukraine
