= Terezyne =

Rural locality in Kyiv Oblast, Ukraine

Terezyne Терезине
- Rural settlement
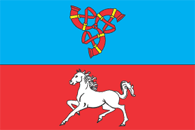
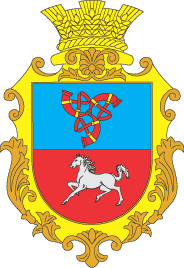
- Flag Coat of arms

- Location of Terezyne in Ukraine Terezyne (Ukraine)
- Coordinates: 49°51′27″N 30°06′36″E
- Country: Ukraine
- Oblast: Kyiv Oblast
- Raion: Bila Tserkva Raion
- Urban-type settlement status: 1987

Population (2001)
  - Total: 1,562
- Time zone: UTC+2 (EET)
  - Summer (DST): UTC+3 (EEST)
- Postal code: 09133
- Area code: +380 4563
- Website: http://rada.gov.ua/

Terezyne (Ukrainian: Терезине) is a rural settlement in the Bila Tserkva Raion (district) of Kyiv Oblast (province) in northern Ukraine. It belongs to Bila Tserkva urban hromada, one of the hromadas of Ukraine. Its population was 1,562 at the 2001 Ukrainian Census. Current population: 1,737 (2022 estimate).

Until 26 January 2024, Terezyne was designated urban-type settlement. On this day, a new law entered into force which abolished this status, and Terezyne became a rural settlement.
