= Stavyshche settlement hromada =

Stavyshche settlement hromada Ставищенська селищна громада
- Hromada
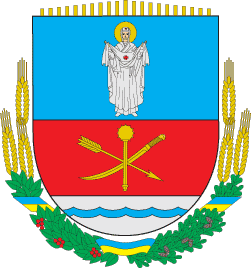
- Seal
- Interactive map of Stavyshche settlement hromada
- Country: Ukraine
- Oblast: Kyiv
- Raion: Bila Tserkva

Area
  - Total: 673.2 km^{2} (259.9 sq mi)

Population (2020)
  - Total: 20,599
  - Density: 30.60/km^{2} (79.25/sq mi)
- Settlements: 30
- Villages: 29
- Towns: 1

Stavyshche settlement hromada (Ukrainian: Ставищенська селищна громада) is a hromada of Ukraine, located in Bila Tserkva Raion, Kyiv Oblast. Its administrative center is the town of Stavyshche.

It has an area of 673.2 square kilometres (259.9 mi^{2}) and a population of 20,599, as of 2020.

The hromada includes 30 settlements: 1 town (Stavyshche), and 29 villages:

- Antonivka
- Besidka
- Bohatyrka
- Brylivka
- Vasylykha
- Vesele
- Vynarivka
- Vyshkivske
- Heisykha
- Hostra Mohyla
- Hryhorivska Sloboda
- Zhuravlykha
- Ivanivka
- Krasylivka
- Kryvets
- Liubcha
- Polkovnyche
- Popruzhna
- Rozkishna
- Rozumnytsia
- Snizhky
- Stanislavchyk
- Stryzhavka
- Sukhyi Yar
- Torchytskyi Stepok
- Torchytsia
- Chervone
- Yurkivka
- Yasenivka

== See also ==
- List of hromadas of Ukraine
