= Rokytne settlement hromada =

Rokytne settlement hromada Рокитнянська селищна громада
- Hromada
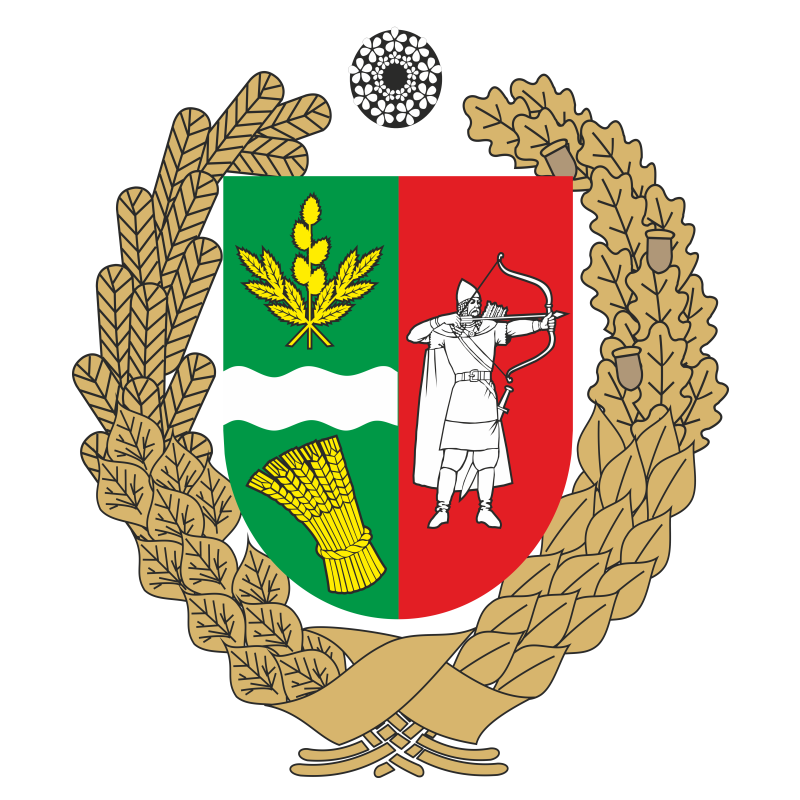
- Seal
- Interactive map of Rokytne settlement hromada
- Country: Ukraine
- Oblast: Kyiv
- Raion: Bila Tserkva

Area
  - Total: 664.8 km^{2} (256.7 sq mi)

Population (2020)
  - Total: 25,279
  - Density: 38.02/km^{2} (98.48/sq mi)
- Settlements: 23
- Villages: 22
- Towns: 1

Rokytne settlement hromada (Ukrainian: Рокитнянська селищна громада) is a hromada of Ukraine, located in Bila Tserkva Raion, Kyiv Oblast. Its administrative center is the town of Rokytne.

It has an area of 664.8 square kilometres (256.7 mi^{2}) and a population of 25,279, as of 2020.

The hromada includes 23 settlements: 1 town (Rokytne), and 22 villages:

- Bakumivka
- Byriuky
- Busheve
- Zhytni Gory
- Zapruddia
- Kalynivka
- Kolesnykove
- Lubianka
- Liubka
- Makivka
- Nastashka
- Nova Makivka
- Olshanytsia
- Pershotravneve
- Ostriv
- Puhachivka
- Romashky
- Savyntsi
- Syniava
- Teleshivka
- Troitske
- Sharky

== See also ==
- List of hromadas of Ukraine
