= Tarashcha =

City in Kyiv Oblast, Ukraine

Tarashcha Тараща Tarascha
- City
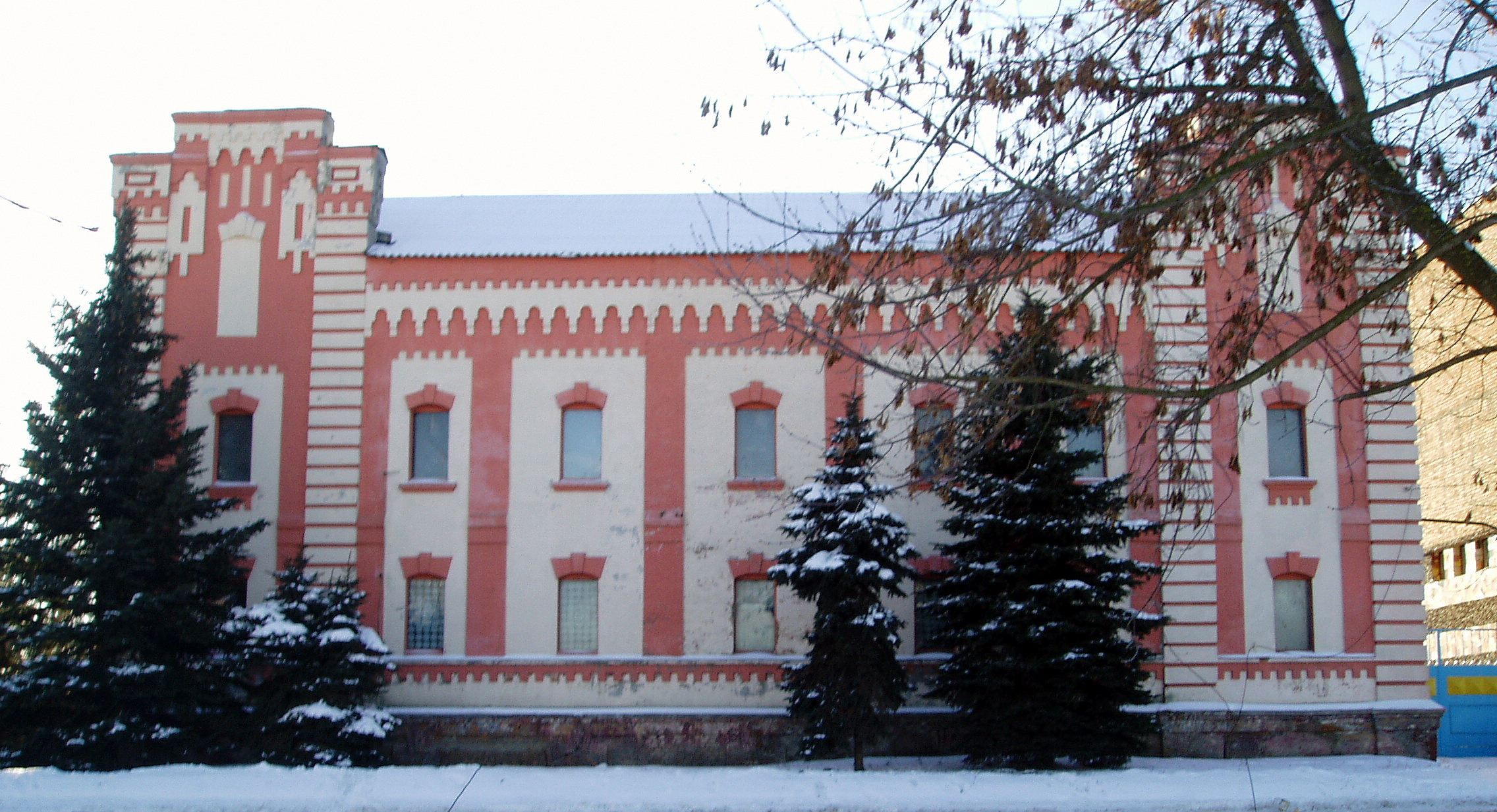
- Steam mill

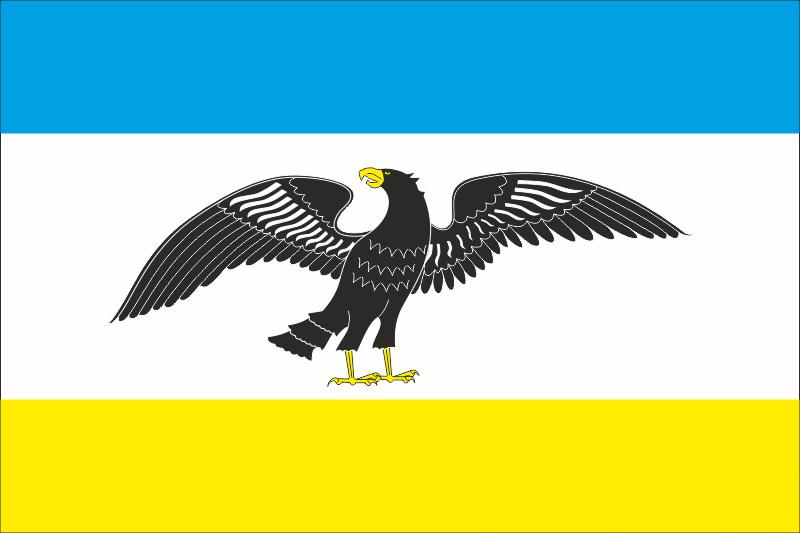
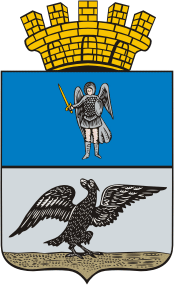
- Flag Coat of arms
- Interactive map of Tarashcha
- Location of Tarashcha Tarashcha (Ukraine)
- Coordinates: 49°33′N 30°30′E
- Country: Ukraine
- Oblast: Kyiv Oblast
- Raion: Bila Tserkva Raion
- Hromada: Tarashcha urban hromada
- Founded Magdeburg Rights: 1709; 1791

Area
  - Total: 36.96 km^{2} (14.27 sq mi)

Population (2022)
  - Total: 9,689
  - Density: 262.1/km^{2} (679.0/sq mi)
- Postal code: 09504
- Area code: +380 4566

Tarashcha or Tarascha (Ukrainian: Тараща, IPA: [tɐˈrɑʃtʃɐ]) is a city in Bila Tserkva Raion, Kyiv Oblast (region) in central Ukraine. It hosts the administration of Tarashcha urban hromada, one of the hromadas of Ukraine. Population: 9,689 (2022 estimate).

== History ==
Tarashcha is an historic Cossack town (in the 17th century through 17th century - rather a city). It was founded when the area was under the ultimate control of the Polish–Lithuanian Commonwealth.

Until the mid-20th century, the town had a significant Jewish community, being a shtetl. The town was occupied by the German army on July 23, 1941.

Jews were forced to wear armbands with the Star of David, were not allowed to buy food and were relegated to forced labour. Afterward, a ghetto was established on Tarasha Street. Executions of the Jewish population were carried out by German security forces, S.S. Viking Division, detachment of Einsatzgruppe, in cooperation with Einsatzkommando 5 and local police. The execution of Jews started from the very first days of German occupation. Several executions were conducted. The main actions took place in August 1941, with 400 Jewish victims; on September 10, 1941, during which several hundred Jews were killed; while on November 9, 1941, the ghetto was liquidated. Altogether, up to 1,000 Jews were exterminated in Tarashcha between August and November 1941.

=== Modern developments ===
Recently, the town has become known as the place of the clandestine burial and later recovery of Georgiy Gongadze, a Ukrainian journalist kidnapped and murdered in 2000.

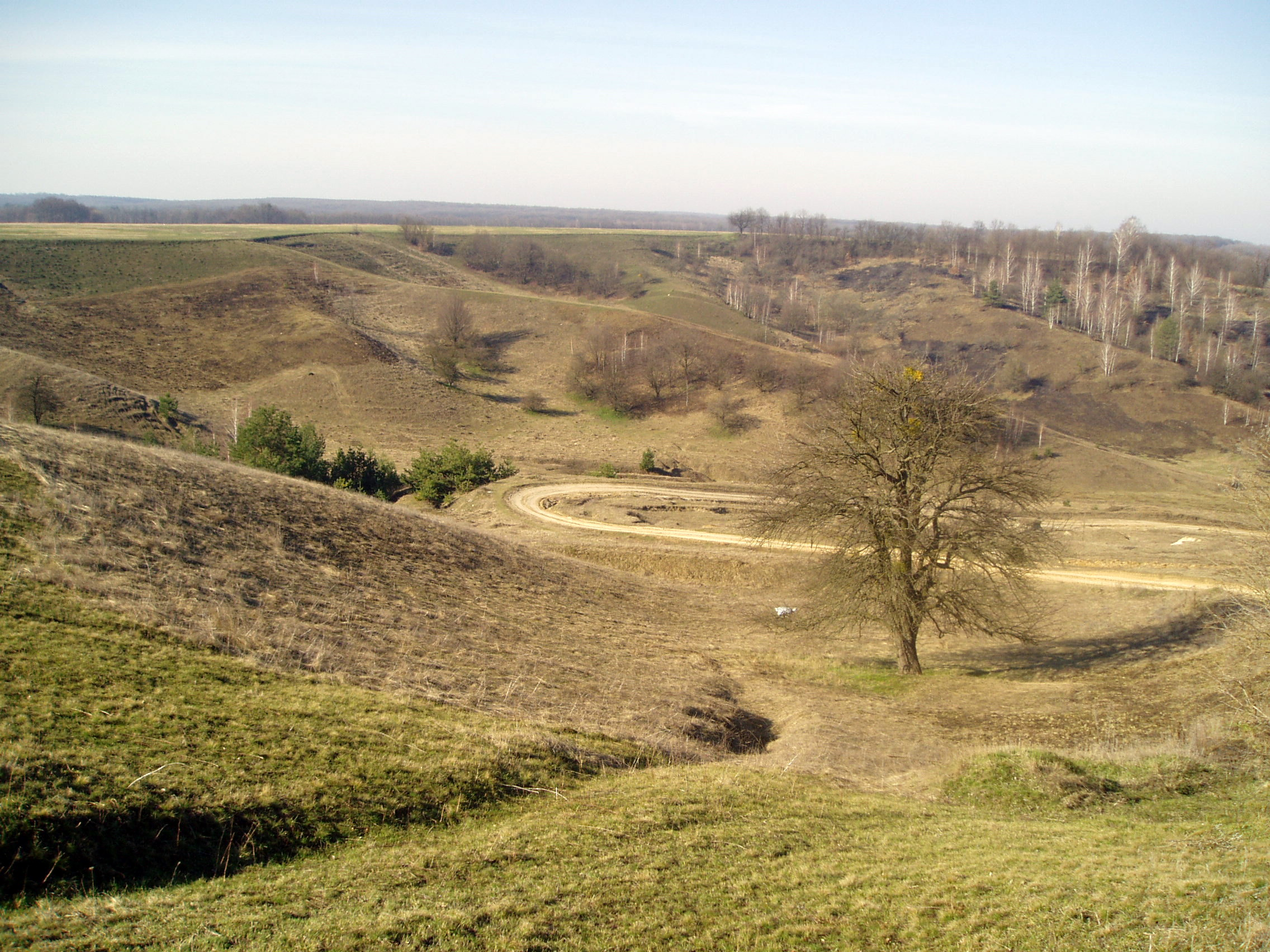
Motorcycle track near Tarashcha

Also, the Tarashcha Raion is closely associated with the prominent Ukrainian politician Oleksandr Moroz: he was born and started his career here, later became elected to the parliament from the local constituency. Moroz is the most notable and influential person in the neighborhood. There were even speculations between these two facts and Moroz's significant role in Gongadze case and Cassette Scandal.

Until 18 July 2020, Tarashcha was the administrative center of Tarashcha Raion. The raion was abolished that day as part of the administrative reform of Ukraine, which reduced the number of raions of Kyiv Oblast to seven. The area of Tarashcha Raion was merged into Bila Tserkva Raion.

== Population ==
=== Language ===
Distribution of the population by native language according to the 2001 census:

Language	Percentage
Ukrainian	97.38%
Russian	2.24%
other/undecided	0.38%

== Notable people ==
- Anatoly Aleksandrov, President of Soviet Academy of Sciences
- Moïse Haissinsky, French-Jewish physicist and radiochemist, worked in the Institut du Radium with Marie Curie
- Agapius Honcharenko, Ukrainian Orthodox priest and dissident
- Oleksandr Moroz, Ukrainian politician, chairman of the Verkhovna Rada
- Volodymyr Sikevych, General Khorunzhy of the Ukrainian People's Army of the Ukrainian People's Republic
- Boris Thomashefsky, American Jewish singer and actor

== See also ==
- Pale of Settlement
