= Tarashcha urban hromada =

Tarashcha urban hromada Таращанська міська громада
- Hromada
- Interactive map of Tarashcha urban hromada
- Country: Ukraine
- Oblast: Kyiv
- Raion: Bila Tserkva

Area
  - Total: 757.3 km^{2} (292.4 sq mi)

Population (2020)
  - Total: 26,010
  - Density: 34.35/km^{2} (88.95/sq mi)
- Settlements: 35
- Cities: 1
- Villages: 34

Tarashcha urban hromada (Ukrainian: Таращанська міська громада) is a hromada of Ukraine, located in Bila Tserkva Raion, Kyiv Oblast. Its administrative center is the city Tarashcha.

It has an area of 757.3 square kilometres (292.4 mi^{2}) and a population of 26,010, as of 2020.

The hromada contains 35 settlements: 1 city (Tarashcha), and 34 villages:

- Antonivka
- Bovkun
- Buda
- Velyka Berezianka
- Velyka Vovnianka
- Veselyi Kut
- Volodymyrivka
- Dubivka
- Kalynove
- Kyrdany
- Kyslivka
- Kivshovata
- Kosiakivka
- Krasiuky
- Kryva
- Kruti Horby
- Lisovychi
- Luka
- Lukianivka
- Makovetske
- Mala Berezianka
- Mala Vovnianka
- Maloberezanske
- Ploske
- Potoky
- Rizhky
- Salykha
- Severynivka
- Stanyshivka
- Stepok
- Ulashivka
- Chervoni Yary
- Chernyn
- Yushkiv Rih

== See also ==
- List of hromadas of Ukraine
