= Bila Tserkva Raion =

Subdivision of Kyiv Oblast, Ukraine

Bila Tserkva Raion Білоцерківський район
- Raion
- Білоцерківський район (Bilotserkivskyi raion)
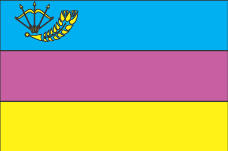
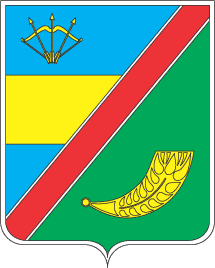
- Flag Coat of arms
- Interactive map of Bila Tserkva Raion
- Coordinates: 49°51′6″N 30°8′4″E
- Country: Ukraine
- Oblast: Kyiv Oblast
- Established: 1930
- Admin. center: Bila Tserkva
- Subdivisions: 13 hromadas

Government
  - Governor: Roman Ivanovych Pluhator

Area
  - Total: 6,514.8 km^{2} (2,515.4 sq mi)

Population (2022)
  - Total: 431,172
  - Density: 66.183/km^{2} (171.41/sq mi)
- Time zone: UTC+02:00 (EET)
  - Summer (DST): UTC+03:00 (EEST)
- Postal index: 075
- Area code: 380-4563
- Website: kyiv-obl.gov.ua

Bila Tserkva Raion (Ukrainian: Білоцерківський район) is a raion (district) in Kyiv Oblast of Ukraine. Its administrative center is the city of Bila Tserkva. Population: 431,172 (2022 estimate).

On 18 July 2020, as part of the administrative reform of Ukraine, the number of raions of Kyiv Oblast was reduced to seven, and the area of Bila Tserkva Raion was significantly expanded. Six abolished raions, Rokytne, Skvyra, Stavyshche, Tarashcha, Tetiiv, and Volodarka Raions, as well as the city of Bila Tserkva, which was previously incorporated as a city of oblast significance and did not belong to the raion, and parts of Bohuslav and Vasylkiv Raions, were merged into Bila Tserkva Raion. The area of the raion before the reform was 1,276.8 square kilometres (493.0 mi^{2}). The January 2020 estimate of the raion population was 48,440 (2020 est.)

== Subdivisions ==
=== Current ===
After the reform in July 2020, the raion consisted of 13 hromadas:

Bila Tserkva Raion subdivisions
Hromada (Community)	Admin. center	Population (2020)	Transferred/Retained from
Bila Tserkva urban	Bila Tserkva	218,981	city of oblast significance of Bila Tserkva;
Fursy rural	Fursy	10,729	Bila Tserkva Raion;
Hrebinky settlement	Hrebinky	13,565	Vasylkiv Raion.
Kovalivka rural	Kovalivka	6,566	Vasylkiv Raion.
Mala Vilshanka rural	Mala Vilshanka	10,636	Bila Tserkva Raion;
Medvyn rural	Medvyn	5,511	Bohuslav Raion.
Rokytne settlement	Rokytne	25,279	Rokytne Raion.
Skvyra urban	Skvyra	31,695	Skvyra Raion.
Stavyshche settlement	Stavyshche	20,599	Stavyshche Raion.
Tarashcha urban	Tarashcha	26,010	Tarashcha Raion.
Tetiiv urban	Tetiiv	30,629	Tetiiv Raion.
Uzyn urban	Uzyn	20,245	Bila Tserkva Raion
Volodarka settlement	Volodarka	15,670	Volodarka Raion.

=== Before 2020 ===
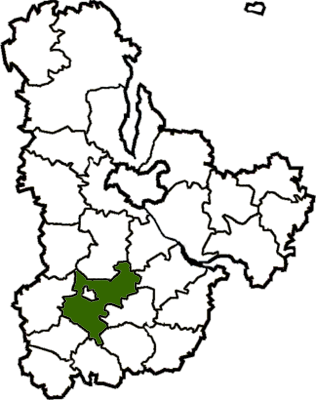
Bila Tserkva Raion in Kyiv Oblast (1966-2020)

Before the 2020 reform, the raion consisted of three hromadas,

- Fursy rural hromada with the administration in Fursy;
- Mala Vilshanka rural hromada with the administration in Mala Vilshanka;
- Uzyn urban hromada with the administration in the city of Uzyn.

== Notable buildings ==
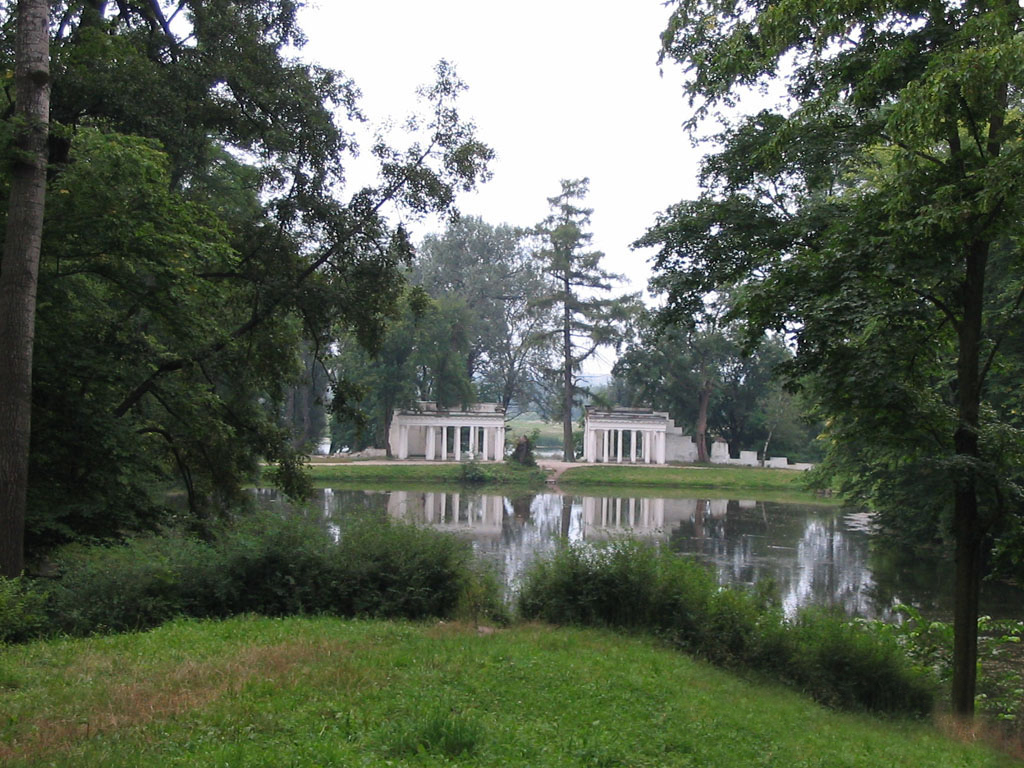
View of the so-called Ruins and the Lazneve lake of the historical landscape park "Oleksandriia".

Various monuments of architecture located within the raion's territory include:

- Monument to Ivan Mazepa, 1991 in the village of Mazepyntsi.
- Church Zishestia Sviatoho Dukha, 1750 in the village of Shkarivka.
- Church Sviatoi Paraskevy, 1903 in the village of Oliinykova Sloboda.
- Church of the Wives of Myronosyts, 1893 in the village of Sorokotiahy.
- Cathedral of the Saint Ioanna Khrestytelia in Bila Tserkva.
- Mykhailivska Church, 1891 in Bila Tserkva.
- Preobrazhenska Church, 1849 in the village of Sukholisy.
- Oleksandriia Park, 1793-1797 in Bila Tserkva.
- Zymovyi (Winter) Palace in Bila Tserkva.

== Notable residents ==
Famous people from the territory that is now known as the Bilotserkivskyi Raion include:

- Ivan Mazepa, from Bila Tserkva, was a Cossack Hetman of the Hetmanate in Left-bank Ukraine, in 1687–1708.
- Pavel Popovich, from Uzyn, is a Soviet cosmonaut of Ukrainian descent, arguably the first ethnic Ukrainian to fly in space.

== See also ==
- Administrative divisions of Kyiv Oblast
