= Oleksandr Polozhynskyi =

Ukrainian singer (born 1972)

- Олександр Положинський
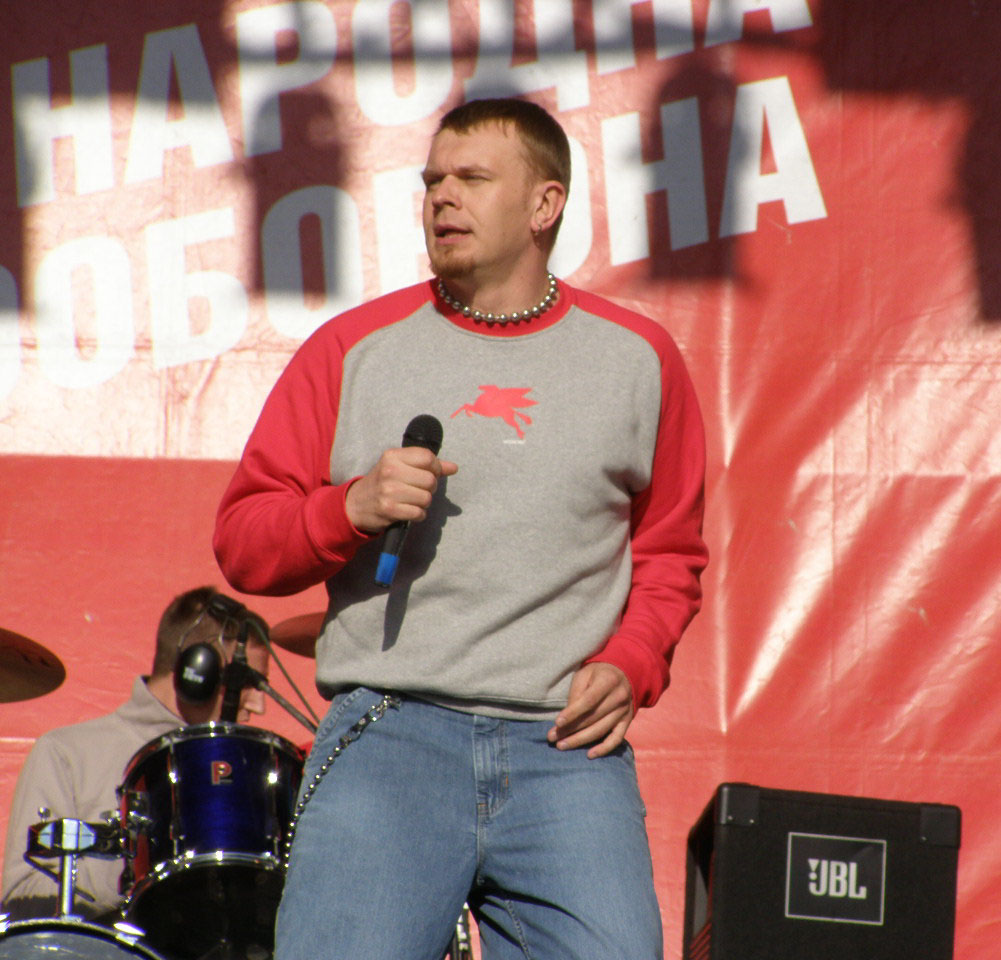
- Polozhynskyi in 2007
- Born: 28 May 1972 (age 54); Lutsk, Ukrainian SSR, Soviet Union
- Education: Lutsk National Technical University
- Occupations: Singer; presenter
- Years active: 1996–present
- Awards: Vasyl Stus Prize
- Musical career
- Genres: Hip hop; rock
- Instrument: Vocals
- Member of: Olexander Polozhinsky and the Three Roses
- Formerly of: Tartak; Buvier; Ol. Iv.'E
- Military career
- Allegiance: Ukraine
- Branch: Ukrainian Ground Forces
- Service years: 2022–present
- Unit: 47th Mechanized Brigade
- Conflicts: Russo-Ukrainian War; Russian invasion of Ukraine; Eastern Ukraine campaign; Battle of Avdiivka

Oleksandr Yevhenovych Polozhynskyi (Note: Ukrainian: Олександр Євгенович Положинський) (born 28 May 1972) is a Ukrainian singer and presenter who became the lead singer of the Tartak music band, and the host of Radio NV. He later became a serviceman with the 47th Mechanized Brigade of the Armed Forces of Ukraine.

== Early life and education ==
Born on 28 May 1972, in the Ukrainian city of Lutsk. At an early age, Polozhynskyi started singing and gave performances at festive matinees. After completing his studies at Lutsk School No.15, he proceeded to the Lviv military boarding school upon his eighth-grade graduation. He attended Lutsk National Technical University's Faculty of Economics to further his studies in economics.

== Music career ==
Playing with the Lutsk band Flies in Tea, Polozhynskyi began his musical career. Later, he became a showman for the punk group Makarov & Peterson. He founded the band Tartak to take part in the Chervona Ruta festival after learning about it in 1996. He played a number of significant roles in Tartak, including creative director, co-producer, singer, presenter, and songwriter. He worked with the Gulyaihorod folk ensemble to incorporate aspects of Ukrainian traditional music into contemporary music.

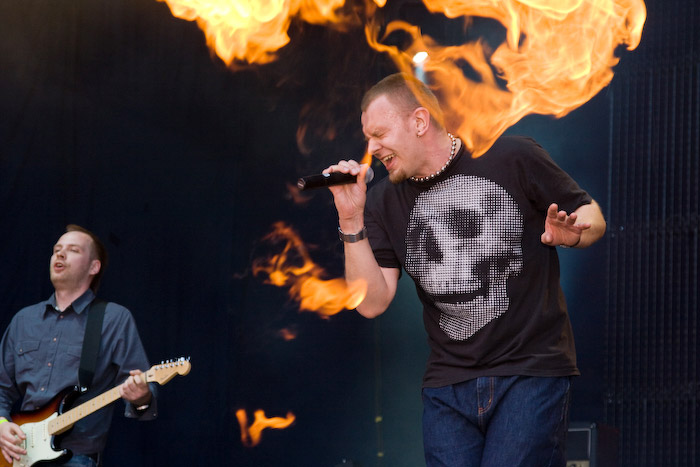
Polozhynskyi with Tartak in 2008

Polozhynskyi worked as a radio and television presenter part-time in addition to his music career. He was the host of radio shows Sounds about on Radio NV and Chipboard Show on Europa Plus. Beginning on 1 October 2007, he co-hosted the morning DSP Show on Europe Plus alongside Andriy Kuzmenko, and Igor Pelykh (until May 2009). He had the headings Sleep in the Hand, Safe, Morning Star, With His Samovar, Pure Song, Shvyryay-Show, and Call to the Friend in particular, together with Kuzma. He hosted the show Sounds of Pro on Radio NV from 2018 to 27 May 2020.

He started the solo project SP in 2009, producing two songs: Tsytsydup (2010) and Choose Me! (2009), which were published on the eve of the presidential election. He started working as a producer in 2011 and chose songs for the contemporary Ukrainian poetic album Po-Vilno, which was released by the studio Coffeine. In the music video for Moral Sex (2012) by Tartak, he also made his directing debut. In 2014, he founded the Bouvier project, with which he released two albums in 2015 and 2019. To support the national football team of Ukraine together with TV channels Football 1/2 recorded a video for the song Here's My Hand.

Together with Ivan Marunych in 2019, he formed the duet Ol. Iv.'E and launched the Bouvier project. He also cooperated with other musicians. He also took part in the volunteer camp at Tartakiv & Tartak. He also participated in the establishment of the volunteer camp Tartakiv&Tartak that same year, which aims to restore the Tartakiv Palace, a 19th-century architectural landmark of national significance.

Following a court battle, Polozhynskyi declared his separation from the bands Tartak and Bouvier on 5 February 2020. That same year saw the launch of his new endeavor, Olexander Polozhinsky and the Three Roses, which included a concert program dubbed Lyrics that included reworked versions of the songs Tartak, Bouvier, and Ol. Iv.'E.

Recent accomplishments for him include his participation in the Banderstadt festival in 2021, and the publication of his 12-song solo album Despite Everything in April 2023. He performed duets in an October Palace event on 5 September 2023, with other artists and bands that he has worked with throughout the years.

== Military career ==
Polozhynskyi enlisted in the Ukrainian Armed Forces reserve in February 2022, serving in the 47th Battalion (which subsequently became the 47th Assault Regiment and the 47th Mechanized Brigade). When he served in the military, he recorded a song honoring volunteers. He said that his eight months in the army had a physical and moral impact on him, and health issues began to come into notice.

Polozhynskyi unexpectedly announced his active duty on 6 December 2022, the Day of the Armed Forces of Ukraine. He said that he does not see himself as a hero and that he has not killed a single opponent in over six months of full-scale combat. He has been in Kyiv on business since February 2023, providing remote support to the brigade's soldiers. In November of that year, he eventually transferred to a different military unit.

== Political positions ==
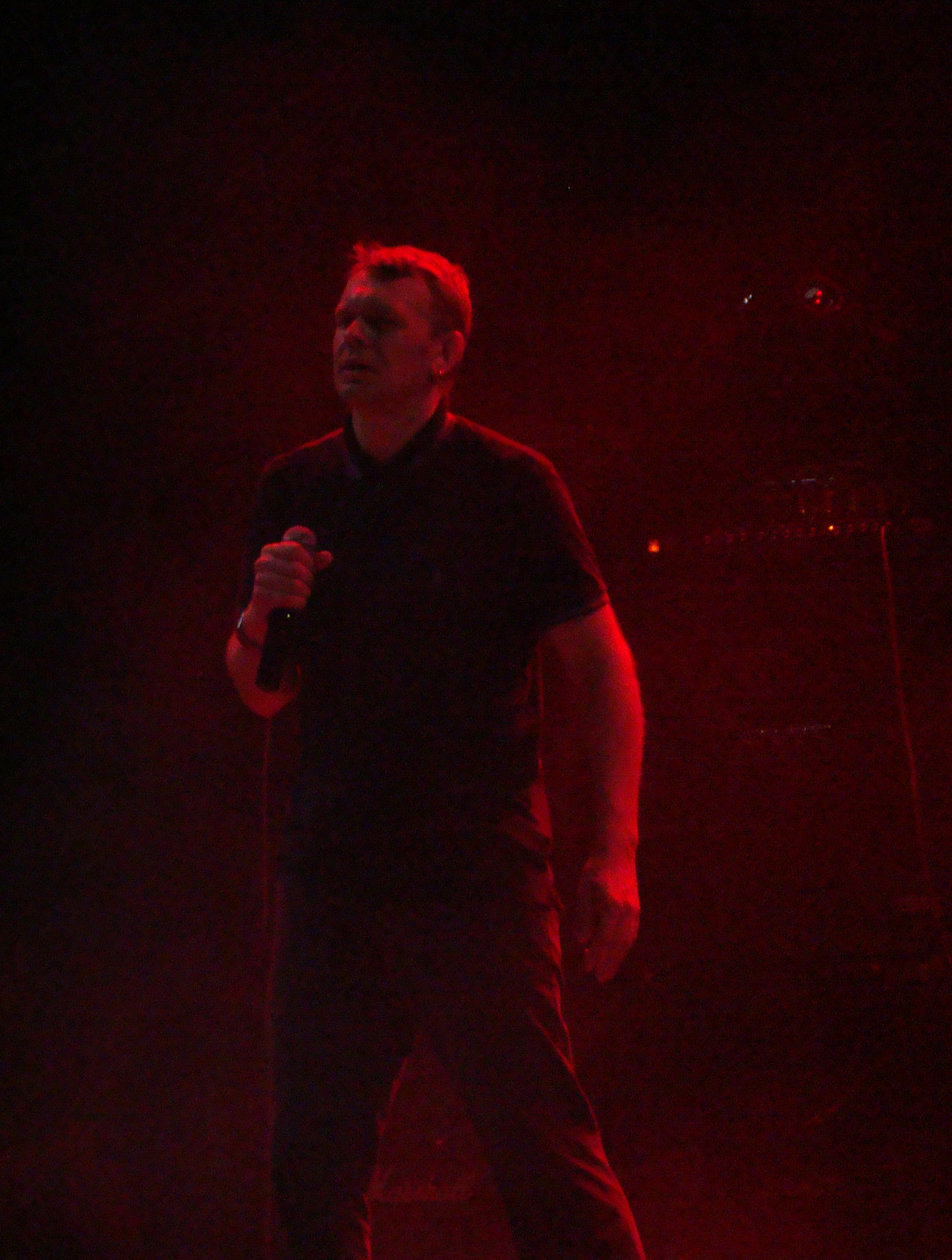
Polozhynskyi performing at the Zashkiv Festival 2011

Polozhynskyi has advocated for the preservation of the Svydovets mountain range and backed campaigns opposing development proposals. He made a video message in May 2018 to show solidarity for Ukrainian filmmaker Oleh Sentsov, who was detained in Russia. He stated on Facebook that he wishes to be independent and requested journalists to confirm information from original sources, despite media speculations that he will run for mayor of Lutsk in 2020.

=== Ukrainian Patriotism ===
In an effort to promote Ukrainian language and culture, Polozhynskyi actively participates in a number of public projects and activities. Under the banner of Don't be Indifferent, he co-organized 14 interactive and musical performances in cities in Central Ukraine, all promoting the Ukrainian language. He also took part in the radio program in Lutsk called Speak Ukrainian and Feel Like a European! His songs and public remarks, he has shown his support for the Ukrainian cause with his song I don't want came to symbolize the Orange Revolution.

=== Support for the Military ===
In 2015, he gave performances for the 72nd Separate Mechanized Brigade and the 3rd Separate Special Forces Regiment with the musicians of Riffmaster. Him alongside another participant in the Ol. Iv.'E band, performed for the troops at Volnovakha. Along with Arsen Mirzoyan, the 128th Mountain Assault Brigade military personnel were congratulated, as was the National Guard unit known as Ukiez. In July 2020, a group of performances including Ukrainian vocalists Polozhynskyi, Zlata Ognevich, Oleksandr Lozovskyi, Ivan Marunych, and Anton Tilis was held on the premises of the State Border Guard Service of Ukraine. He was a member of the Maidan People's Union and often does concerts for different military units in support of Ukrainian soldiers.

== Personal life ==
His father ran a pet store as manager. Polozhynskyi loves to engage in vigorous leisure in his free time, such as football and snowboarding. He resides in Lutsk, owns a flat in Kyiv, and is single. His favorite bands are Tartak, Papa Roach, and Bush. The Paulo Coelho novel The Alchemist left the largest influence. He also consider Vyacheslav Lypynsky to be among the most significant figures in Ukrainian history.

== Discography ==
Year	Name	Album	Notes
2012	Партія снайперів (Sniper Party)	Single non-album	for Kozak System
2012	Брат за брата (Brother for Brother)	Single non-album	for Kozak System
2013	Вагомі слова	Single non-album	for Kozak System
2014	Brat za brata	Single non-album	for Kozak System
2014	Битим склом (Broken Glass)	Single non-album	for Kozak System
2016	Не моя (Not Mine)	Single non-album	with Violet band
2016	Вокзали	Single non-album	with Alexjazz & The Cancel and Ira Shvaidak
2017	Мій друг (My Friend)	Single non-album	for Kozak System
2019	Тобі	Single non-album	with Double Life band
2020	Ми трава	Single non-album	with Entree (N.Try) band
2022	Як Ти Там	Single non-album	with ASILIA

== Awards and recognitions ==
Vasyl Stus Award winner in 2013. In 2020, Polozhynskyi declined the Order of Merit III Degree, arguing that the President Volodymyr Zelenskyy ought to honor musician Andriy Antonenko, physician Yuliia Kuzmenko, and nurse Yana Duhar (who is charged with killing journalist Pavel Sheremet).
