= Sytykhiv =

Sytykhiv Ситихів
- Location within Lviv Oblast Location within Ukraine
- Coordinates: 49°55′36″N 24°07′22″E
- Country: Ukraine
- Oblast: Lviv Oblast
- Raion: Lviv Raion
- First mentioned: 1571

Area
  - Total: 6.3 km^{2} (2.4 sq mi)

Population (2001 Census)
  - Total: 347
  - Density: 55.08/km^{2} (142.7/sq mi)
- Time zone: UTC+2 (EET)
  - Summer (DST): UTC+3 (EEST)
- Postal code: 80382
- Area code: +380 3252
- Website: Verkhovna Rada of Ukraine

Sytykhiv (Ukrainian: Ситихів; Polish: Sieciechów) is a village in Lviv Raion (district) of Lviv Oblast (province) of western Ukraine. The village is located 15 kilometres (9.3 mi) from the oblast's administrative center, Lviv. It belongs to Lviv urban hromada, one of the hromadas of Ukraine. As of the 2001 All-Ukrainian Census, Sytykhiv's total population is 347.

It is believed that the name Sytykhiv is derived from the Proto-Slavic name Sebetikh. The first settlement in the location carried the name Sebetikhiv dvir. Its name later transformed into Setikhiv, and later Sytykhiv. The first written mention of the settlement dates back to 1571.

The only church in the city, the Church of the Assumption of the Blessed Virgin Mary is an example of traditional Ukrainian wooden church architecture. It was built in 1878 and is currently under jurisdiction of the Ukrainian Greek Catholic Church.

Until 18 July 2020, Sytykhiv belonged to Zhovkva Raion. The raion was abolished in July 2020 as part of the administrative reform of Ukraine, which reduced the number of raions of Lviv Oblast to seven. The area of Zhovkva Raion was merged into Lviv Raion.
