= Horodzhiv =

Rural locality in Lviv Oblast, Ukraine

Horodzhiv Городжів
- Village
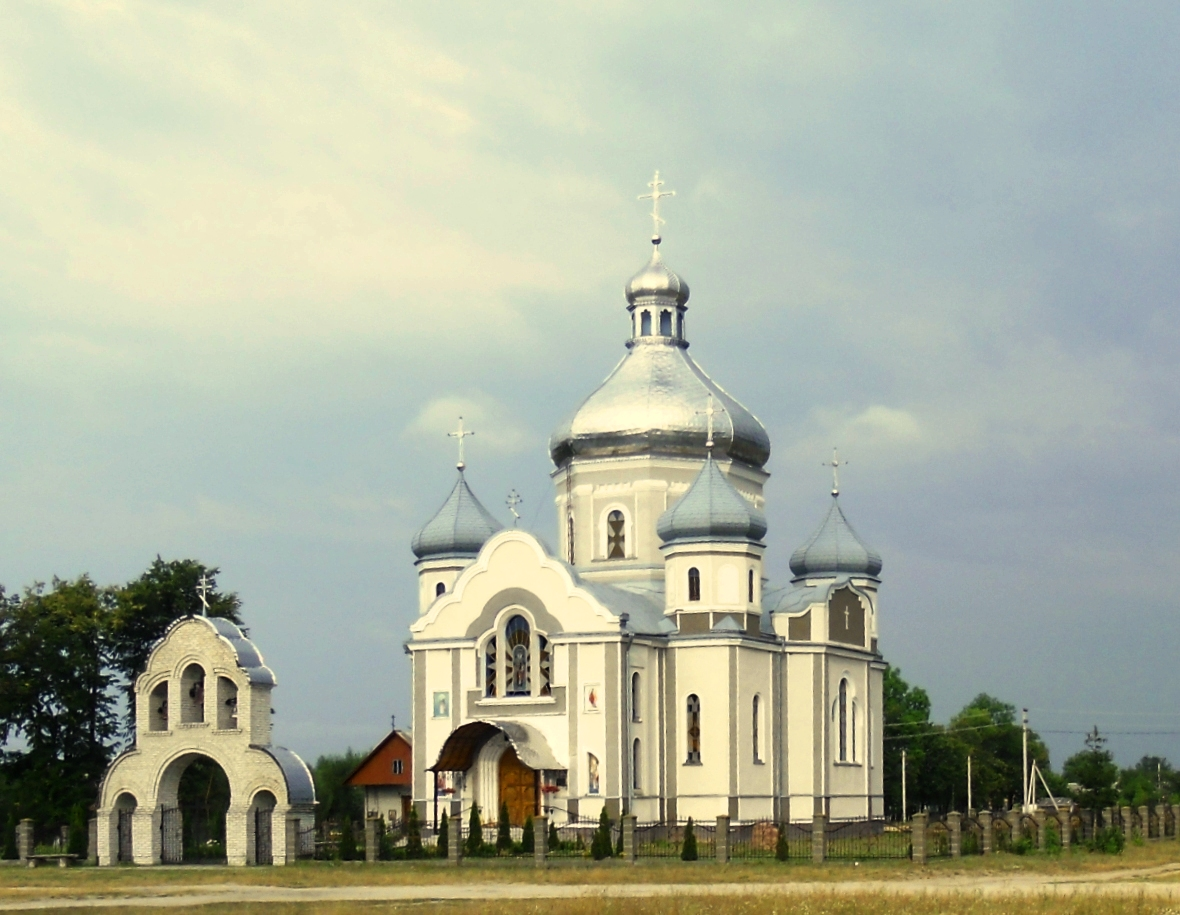
- Newly built Church of St. Nicholas the Wonderworker

- Location within Lviv Oblast
- Coordinates: 50°07′40″N 23°46′28″E
- Country: Ukraine
- Oblast: Lviv Oblast
- District: Lviv Raion

Area
  - Total: 241 km^{2} (93 sq mi)
- Elevation /(average value of): 229 m (751 ft)

Population
  - Total: 1,054
  - Density: 4.37/km^{2} (11.3/sq mi)
- Time zone: UTC+2 (EET)
  - Summer (DST): UTC+3 (EEST)
- Postal code: 80336
- Area code: +380 3252
- Website: місто Городжів/райцентр Жовква ^{(Ukrainian)}

Horodzhiv (Ukrainian: Горо́джів) is a village (selo) in Lviv Raion, Lviv Oblast, of Western Ukraine. It belongs to Dobrosyn-Maheriv settlement hromada, one of the hromadas of Ukraine. The population of the village is about 1054 people. Local government is administered by Lavrykivska village council.

Until 18 July 2020, Horodzhiv belonged to Zhovkva Raion. The raion was abolished in July 2020 as part of the administrative reform of Ukraine, which reduced the number of raions of Lviv Oblast to seven. The area of Zhovkva Raion was merged into Lviv Raion.

== Geography ==
The village is located above the Bila River, in a low marshy area on the altitude of 229 metres (750 ft) above sea level. It is at a distance 5 kilometres (3.1 mi) on the west of the Highway M09 (Ukraine) ( M 09), which is part of the Warsaw – Lviv route.
The distance from the regional center of Lviv is 49 kilometres (30 mi), 19 kilometres (12 mi) from the district center Zhovkva and 25 kilometres (16 mi) from the city of Rava-Ruska.

== Religious structures ==
There are two churches in the village:

- The Assumption of the Blessed Virgin Mary Church (wood, 1733).
- Church of St. Nicholas the Wonderworker.

== Famous people ==
Dmytro Sapiha – editor, journalist, director of the state enterprise "All-Ukrainian state multi-profile publishing house " KAMENIAR ".
