= Zavadiv, Lviv Raion, Lviv Oblast =

Village in Lviv Oblast, Ukraine

Zavadiv Завадів
- Village
- Location within Lviv Oblast Location within Ukraine
- Coordinates: 49.9447°N 23.9717°E
- Country: Ukraine
- Oblast: Lviv Oblast
- Raion: Lviv Raion
- Hromada: Lviv urban hromada

Zavadiv (Ukrainian: Зава́дів) is a village (selo) in Lviv Raion, Lviv Oblast (province) of Western Ukraine. It belongs to Lviv urban hromada, one of the hromadas of Ukraine.

Until 18 July 2020, Zavadiv belonged to Zhovkva Raion. The raion was abolished in July 2020 as part of the administrative reform of Ukraine, which reduced the number of raions of Lviv Oblast to seven. The area of Zhovkva Raion was merged into Lviv Raion.
