= Serhii Koretskyi =

Prime Minister of Ukraine since 2026

- Сергій Корецький
- Koretskyi in 2026

20th Prime Minister of Ukraine
- Incumbent
- Assumed office 16 July 2026
- President: Volodymyr Zelenskyy
- Deputy: Denys Shmyhal; Vsevolod Chentsov; Tetyana Berezhna
- Preceded by: Yulia Svyrydenko

CEO of Naftogaz of Ukraine
- In office 14 May 2025 – 16 July 2026
- Preceded by: Oleksiy Chernyshov
- Succeeded by: Serhiy Fedorenko (acting)

Personal details
- Born: Serhii Fedorovych Koretskyi; 14 March 1978 (age 48) Lutsk, Ukrainian SSR, Soviet Union
- Party: Independent
- Other political affiliations: Lytvyn's People's Bloc
- Spouse: Iryna Koretska
- Education: Lutsk National Technical University; Kyiv-Mohyla Business School
- Occupation: Businessman; top manager

Serhii Fedorovych Koretskyi (Ukrainian: Сергій Федорович Корецький; born 14 March 1978) is a Ukrainian entrepreneur and top manager who serves as the Prime Minister of Ukraine since July 2026. Previously, he led Ukraine's state-owned gas company Naftogaz.

Koretskyi is also a former Director of PJSC Ukrnafta and JSC Ukrtatnafta.

From 2002 until 2014 Koretskyi was a parliamentary assistant to various People's Deputies in the Verkhovna Rada (Ukraine's national parliament). He also unsuccessfully tried to win his own seat in the 2006 Ukrainian parliamentary election.

== Early life ==
Koretskyi was born on 14 March 1978 in Lutsk.

== Education ==
In 2001, Serhii Koretskyi graduated from the Mechanical Engineering Faculty at Lutsk National Technical University, and in 2005, from the Business Faculty at the same university. In 2019, he participated in the Executive MBA Program at the Kyiv-Mohyla Business School.

== Career ==
=== 1997–2018: Continuum Group, Western Oil Group and political career ===
From 1997 to 2018, Koretskyi worked at Continuum Group (Lutsk), rising from an analyst to the CEO. The founders and owners of Continuum Group were Ihor Yeremeyev and Stepan Ivakhiv.

Between 2002 and 2006, Koretskyi was a parliamentary assistant of Yeremeyev in the Verkhovna Rada (Ukraine's national parliament).

In 2002, he became head of the Western Oil Group (WOG) joint venture, part of Continuum Group, and from 2007, served as the CEO of Continuum's managing company.

In the 2006 Ukrainian parliamentary election Koretskyi tried unsuccessfully to win a seat in the Verkhovna Rada. He was placed 214th on the election list of Lytvyn's People's Bloc, with 2.44% of the votes this political alliance did not overcome the 3% election threshold. In the 2006 Ukrainian local elections he also failed to win a seat in the Volyn Oblast Council for Lytvyn's People's Bloc.

Between 2007 and 2012 Koretskyi was a parliamentary assistant of Kateryna Vashchuk of Lytvyn's People's Bloc. From 2012 to 2014 he was (again) a parliamentary assistant of Ihor Yeremeyev.

In 2013, Koretskyi became CEO of WOG, where he developed and implemented business strategies, secured financing, led investor negotiations, and handled M&A transactions. Under his leadership, WOG expanded its activities, including the launch of standalone cafés outside of gas stations.

In 2018, Koretskyi left WOG to focus on other projects.

=== 2019–2022: Private entrepreneurship ===
In April 2019, Koretskyi founded IDEALIST Coffee Co., a coffee company with roasting facilities and a coffee shop chain. As of 2024, 10 locations operate in Kyiv.

IDEALIST Coffee Co. owns its coffee roasting facilities and stands as Ukraine's largest producer of drip coffee.

The company had plans to build the country's largest coffee roasting plant in Hostomel, Kyiv region. During the 2022 Russian occupation of the area, the facilities and part of the equipment were destroyed.

In 2022, IDEALIST Coffee Co. became the coffee supplier for Ukrainian Railways trains. By the end of 2021, Koretskyi stepped down from his position as a beneficiary of the coffee companies, leaving management to professionals. From August 2019 to November 2022, he co-founded and chaired Centurion Group SA, an energy trader based in Switzerland.

=== 2022–2026: Director of PJSC Ukrnafta and CEO of Naftogaz ===
On 9 November 2022, the General Shareholders' Meeting appointed Koretskyi as the Director of PJSC Ukrnafta and PJSC Ukrtatnafta.

In an interview with NV Business, Koretskyi elaborated on the shareholders' priorities: supporting the Ukrainian Armed Forces, ensuring energy security, and fulfilling social responsibilities. In 2023, Ukrnafta increased oil and condensate production by 3%, reaching 1.4 million tons, and gas production by 6%, totaling 1.1 billion cubic meters.

For the first time in the company's history, Ukrnafta prepared its financial plan according to the requirements of the Law of Ukraine "On the Management of State-Owned Assets". In 2023, Ukrnafta ranked first in Opendatabot's index of the best extractive enterprises, with a turnover of 95.17 billion Ukrainian hryvnia (UAH). The company also reported a net profit of 23.6 billion UAH, confirmed by an independent audit conducted by Grant Thornton.

In 2023, Ukrnafta fully repaid its tax debt of 6.9 billion UAH.

Under Koretskyi's leadership, the company optimisіed costs, modernisіed production, and launched an investment program to increase oil and gas recovery.

Ukrnafta also expanded its partnerships with international companies to replace obsolete Soviet, Russian, and Belarusian equipment. The сompany started cooperation with the American Petroleum Institute (API) for standardisation and certification. Moreover, Ukrnafta upgraded its equipment with modern technology, such as electric submersible pumps from Oil Dynamics and Baker Hughes and purchased specialised buses and telescopic loaders.

In 2023, Ukrnafta had significant growth in its non-fuel segment, with a 53% increase in non-fuel transactions, reaching 4.6 million, and a 74% increase in revenues.

Koretskyi prioritized social responsibility, with Ukrnafta providing 1.25 billion UAH in charitable donations in 2023. The company also contributed 100 million UAH toward purchasing 50 armored personnel carriers (APCs) for the "Steel Border" unit and funded several batches of pickups for the Armed Forces of Ukraine.

In early 2024, Ukrnafta donated over 50 million UAH to purchase 1,000 FPV drones and other military equipment. The Ministry of Defence of Ukraine also confirmed in May 2023 that Ukrnafta was meeting all its fuel supply obligations to the military.

In October 2024, Duncan Nightingale, Chair of the Supervisory Board of PJSC Ukrnafta, praised the company's new management team and the implementation of corporate governance principles compliant with OECD standards.

In November 2024, Koretskyi summarised two years of state management at Ukrnafta and Ukrtatnafta. Under his leadership, the company reported approximately 40 billion UAH in profits, contributed nearly UAH 80 billion in taxes to the state budget, and distributed over 10 billion UAH in dividends. Key milestones included the adoption of OECD standards, the establishment of an independent supervisory board, and advancements in production, such as the drilling of new wells and the first 3D seismic acquisition in a decade.

On 14 May 2025, Koretskyi took up the position of chairman of the Board of Naftogaz and began performing the duties of the head of Naftogaz Group.

=== 2026–present: Prime Minister ===
Koretskyi during meeting with Friedrich Merz, October 2026

On 16 July 2026, the Verkhovna Rada appointed Koretskyi as prime minister of Ukraine. His nomination, submitted by President Volodymyr Zelenskyy, was approved by 289 members of parliament.

== Personal life ==
Koretskyi is married to Iryna Koretska. The couple has, according to Ukrainian media, no children.

In his 2025 income declaration, Koretskyi stated to have had more than 331 thousand US dollars, more than 527 thousand euros and 1.1 million Ukrainian hryvnia (UAH) in bank accounts. He declared 32 million UAH in income.

On his birthday in 2024, Koretskyi donated 1 million Ukrainian hryvnia to the Ukrainian Armed Forces.

Political offices
Preceded by Yulia Svyrydenko	Prime Minister of Ukraine; 2026–present	Incumbent
