= Mali Hrybovychi =

Rural locality in Lviv Oblast, Ukraine

Mali Hrybovychi Малі Грибовичі
- Village
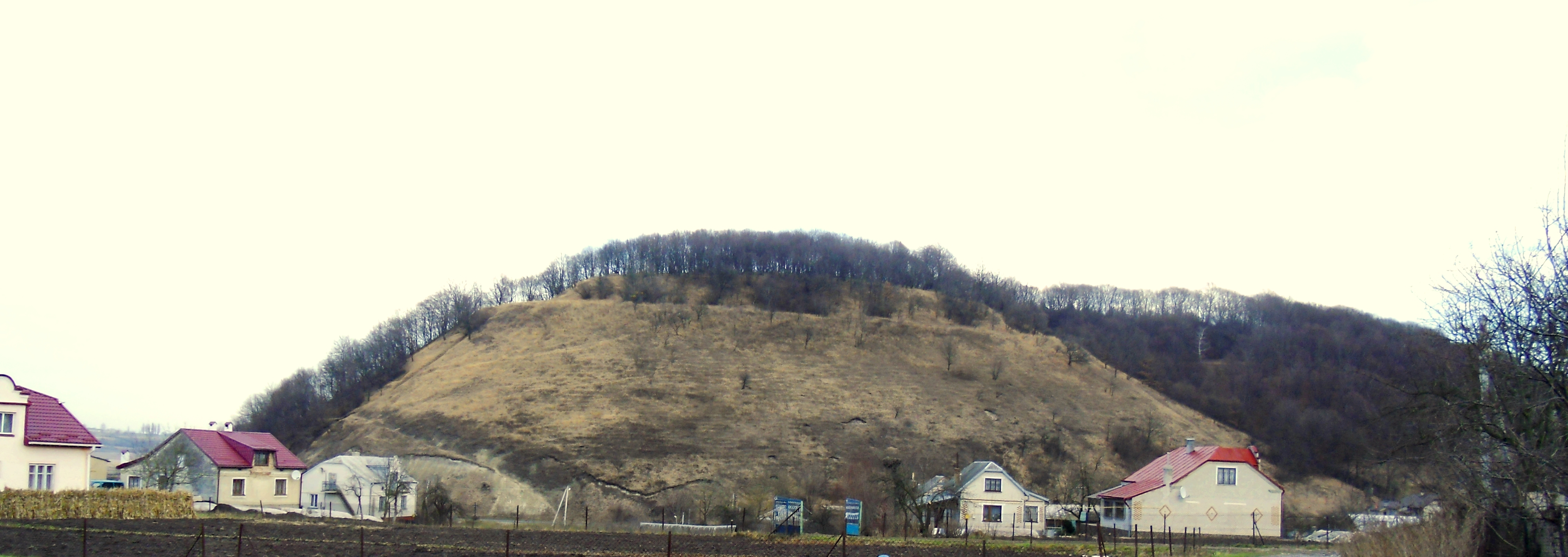

- Location within Ukraine Location within Lviv Oblast
- Coordinates: 49°54′49″N 23°59′30″E
- Country: Ukraine
- Oblast: Lviv Oblast
- District: Lviv Raion
- Established: 1440

Area
  - Total: 1,080 km^{2} (420 sq mi)
- Elevation /(average value of): 291 m (955 ft)

Population
  - Total: 330
  - Density: 3,833/km^{2} (9,930/sq mi)
- Time zone: UTC+2 (EET)
  - Summer (DST): UTC+3 (EEST)
- Postal code: 80380
- Area code: +380 3252
- Website: село Малі Грибовичі ^{(Ukrainian)}

Mali Hrybovychi (Ukrainian: Малі́ Грибо́вичі, Polish: Grzybowice Małe) is a small village (selo), which has only 330, persons and is located in Lviv Raion, Lviv Oblast of Western Ukraine. The village is located at a distance of 2 kilometres (1.2 mi) from the village Velyki Hrybovychi, 16 kilometres (9.9 mi) from the regional center of Lviv and 27 kilometres (17 mi) from the district center Zhovkva. It belongs to Lviv urban hromada, one of the hromadas of Ukraine.

Between the two villages, Mali Hrybovychi and Velyki Hrybovychi (Ukrainian: Велкі Грибовичі), rises Chorna Hora (Ukrainian: Чорна гора) height of 354 metres (1,160 ft). Local government is administered by Hrybovytska village council.
The first record of the village dates back to 1440 year, but by archaeological excavations have revealed a settlement of the Stone Age (third millennium BC).

Until 18 July 2020, Mali Hrybovychi belonged to Zhovkva Raion. The raion was abolished in July 2020 as part of the administrative reform of Ukraine, which reduced the number of raions of Lviv Oblast to seven. The area of Zhovkva Raion was merged into Lviv Raion.
