= Malekhiv =

Malekhiv Малехів Malechów
- Village
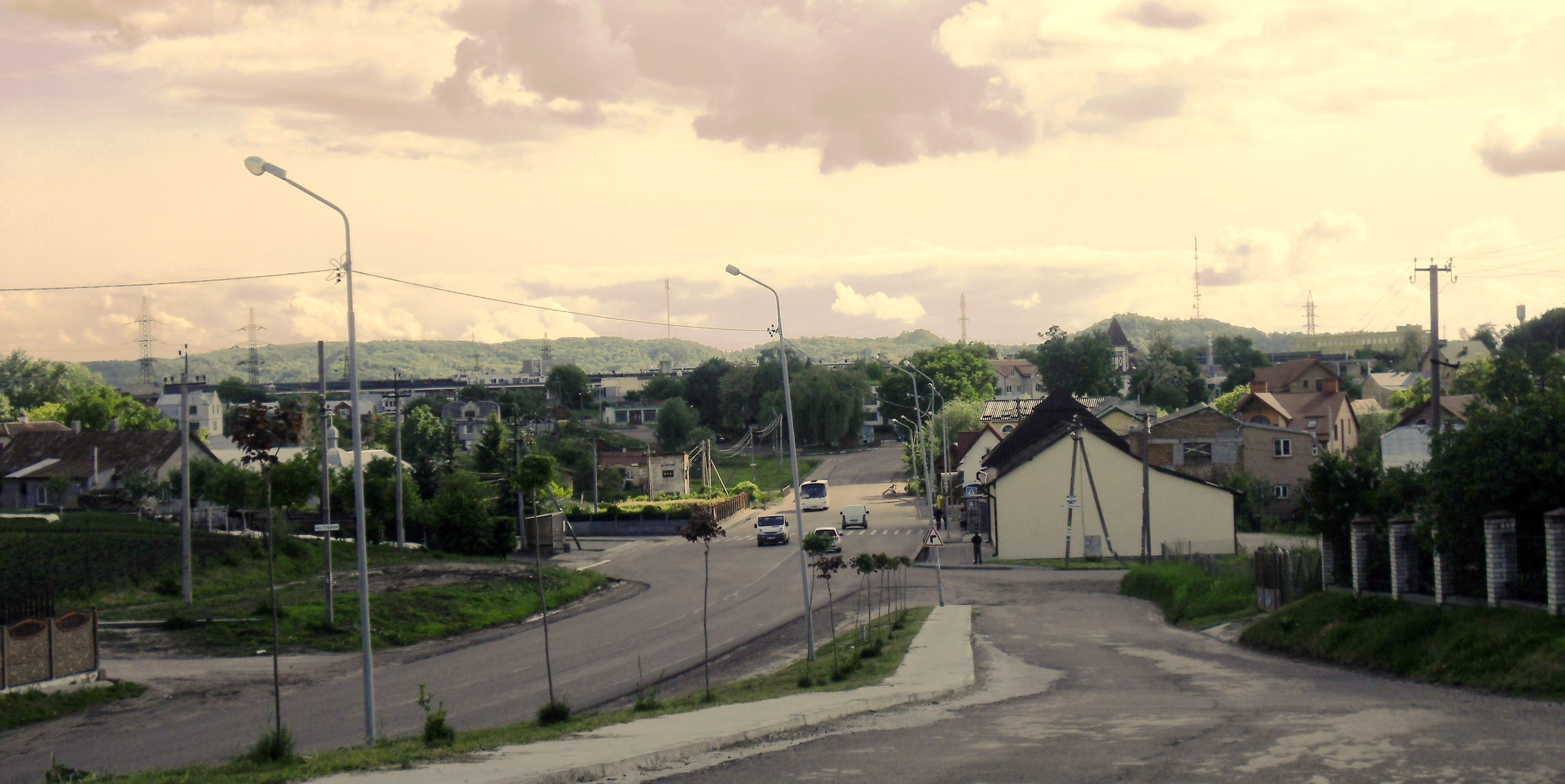

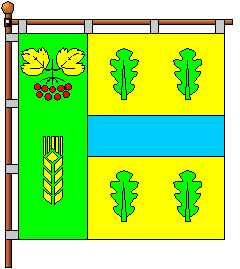
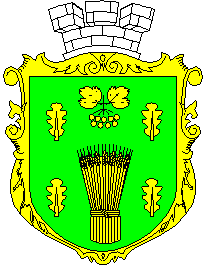
- Flag Coat of arms

- Location within Ukraine Location within Lviv Oblast
- Coordinates: 49°52′54″N 24°14′31″E
- Country: Ukraine
- Oblast: Lviv Oblast
- District: Lviv Raion
- Hromada: Lviv urban hromada
- Established: 1377

Area
  - Total: 579 km^{2} (224 sq mi)
- Elevation /(average value of): 268 m (879 ft)

Population
  - Total: 3 000
  - Density: 403,450/km^{2} (1,044,900/sq mi)
- Time zone: UTC+2 (EET)
  - Summer (DST): UTC+3 (EEST)
- Postal code: 80383
- Area code: +380 322
- Website: село Малехів ^{(Ukrainian)}

Malekhiv (Ukrainian: Малехів) is a village in Lviv Raion of Lviv Oblast, 6 kilometres (3.7 mi) northeast of the city of Lviv. It is 29 kilometres (18 mi) from the raion’s seat, Zhovkva, and 7 kilometres (4.3 mi) from Velyki Hrybovychi. Malekhiv belongs to Lviv urban hromada, one of the hromadas of Ukraine.

Its average elevation is 268 metres (880 ft).

Local government is Malekhivska village council.

== History ==
The first mention of the village of Malekhiv in historical documents refers to 1377.

History of the name — Malechow (Lemberg Umgebung), Galicia, Austria; later Malechów (Lwów), Lwów, Poland; now Malekhiv, Zhovkva, L′viv, Ukraine.

Until 18 July 2020, Malekhiv belonged to Zhovkva Raion. The raion was abolished in July 2020 as part of the administrative reform of Ukraine, which reduced the number of raions of Lviv Oblast to seven. The area of Zhovkva Raion was merged into Lviv Raion.

== Population ==
=== Language ===
The distribution of population by main language according to 2001 Ukrainian census

| Language | Number of speakers | Percentage |
|---|---|---|
| Ukrainian | 2299 | 98.42% |
| Romani | 17 | 0.73% |
| Russian | 16 | 0.68% |
| Polish | 3 | 0.13% |
| Belarusian | 1 | 0.04% |
| Total | 2336 | 100% |

=== Religion ===
There are 3 churches in Malekhiv. The Ukrainian Greek Catholic Church of Cathedral of the Most Holy Mother of God. The Orthodox Church of the Most Holy Mother of God. The Roman Catholic Church of Saint Michael the Archangel.

The existence of those churches belonging to three different concessions can be attributed to the region's complex history, particularly its period under Polish rule.
