= Yevhen Nahirnyi =

Ukrainian architect (1885–1951)

- Євген Нагірний
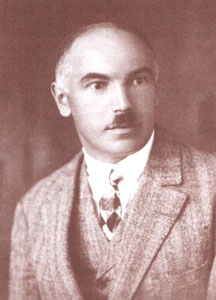
- Born: Yevhen Vasyliovych Nahirnyi; 13 August 1885; Rudne, Austria-Hungary (now Ukraine)
- Died: 8 June 1951 (aged 65); Lviv
- Education: Lviv Polytechnic School
- Occupation: Architect

Yevhen Nahirnyi (Ukrainian: Євген Васильович Нагірний; 13 August 1885 – 8 June 1951) was a Ukrainian architect.

== Biography ==
Yevhen Nahirnyi was born on 13 August 1885 in Rudne, now the Lviv urban hromada of the Lviv Raion, Lviv Oblast, Ukraine.

In 1912 he graduated from the Faculty of Architecture of the Lviv Polytechnic School. From 1946 he taught at higher education institutions in Lviv; head of the Department of Architecture at the Lviv Institute of Applied and Decorative Arts.

Yevhen Nahirny died on 8 July 1951 in Lviv. He is buried at the Lychakiv Cemetery on field No. 5.

== Works ==
In 1905–1921 he worked with his father Vasyl Nahirnyi in Lviv. Nahirnyi is the author of more than 500 residential, public, and church buildings in Western Ukraine.

For the construction of houses in Lviv, Nahirnyi used the styles of neoclassicism and functionalism; for sacred buildings, he used Ukrainian Baroque and folk architecture. When designing wooden churches, he mainly developed the traditions of the Boyko school. Also, neo-historicism and modernism can be observed in Nahirny's works.

== Sources ==
- Черкес Б., Грицюк Л. Архітектор Євген Нагірний // Dzvin. 1991. No. 4.
- Космолінська Н. Нагірні, Леви: історія одного врятованого архіву // Поступ. 29.09.2000.
