= Velyki Hrybovychi =

Rural locality in Lviv Oblast, Ukraine

Velyki Hrybovychi Великі Грибовичі
- Village
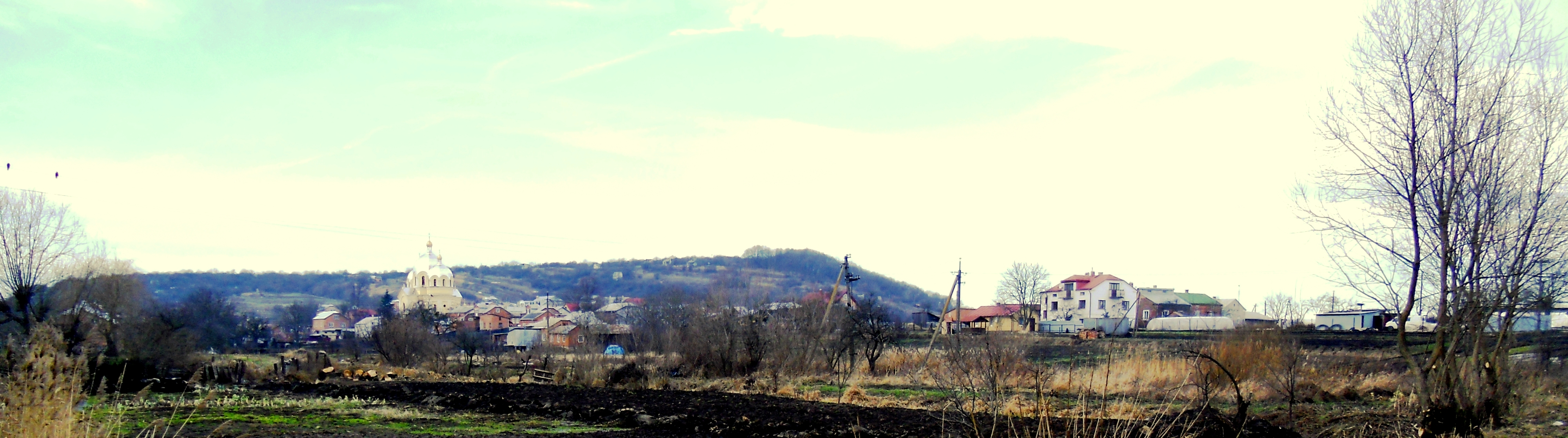

- Location within Ukraine Location within Lviv Oblast
- Coordinates: 49°54′41″N 24°03′08″E
- Country: Ukraine
- Oblast: Lviv Oblast
- District: Lviv Raion
- Hromada: Lviv urban hromada
- Established: 1440

Area
  - Total: 1,230 km^{2} (470 sq mi)
- Elevation /(average value of): 251 m (823 ft)

Population
  - Total: 1,232
  - Density: 13,854/km^{2} (35,880/sq mi)
- Time zone: UTC+2 (EET)
  - Summer (DST): UTC+3 (EEST)
- Postal code: 80380
- Area code: +380 3252
- Website: село Великі Грибовичі ^{(Ukrainian)}

Velyki Hrybovychi (Ukrainian: Вели́кі Грибо́вичі) is a village in Lviv Raion, Lviv Oblast in western Ukraine. It belongs to Lviv urban hromada, one of the hromadas of Ukraine. The population of the village is about 1232 people. Local government is administered by Hrybovychi village council.

== Geography ==
The village is located in the direction Highway M09 (Ukraine) ( M 09) at a distance 10 kilometres (6.2 mi) from the regional center of Lviv and 22 kilometres (14 mi) from the district center Zhovkva. The village Mali Hrybovychi is located not far, a distance of 2 kilometres (1.2 mi), from Velyki Hrybovychi.

== History ==
The first written mention dates back to year 1440. In the village there was a Greek Catholic parish. The Roman Catholic parish was located in the nearby village of Malekhiv.

During the times of Soviet rule, Velyki Hrybovychi became the site of a landfill serving the city of Lviv. After almost 60 years of use, 14,3 million tons of waste were collected in the area. The landfill was closed in 2016 following a major fire and a landslide, as a result of which three firemen and one communal service employee lost their lives. In 2017 Egis Group presented a plan of recultivation for the area.

Between 2020 and 2024, with support of the Ministry of Communities and Territories Development and the European Bank for Reconstruction and Development, the slopes of the former landfill were stabilized, a drainage system was created, and a waterproof covering was installed. In 2021, a biogas generator started its operation, producing heat and electricity from the waste. In 2025 the dome of the landfill was covered with sandstone and earth, and in 2026 first trees were planted for a future recreational zone.

Until 18 July 2020, Velyki Hrybovychi belonged to Zhovkva Raion. The raion was abolished in July 2020 as part of the administrative reform of Ukraine, which reduced the number of raions of Lviv Oblast to seven. The area of Zhovkva Raion was merged into Lviv Raion.

== Attractions ==
An architectural monument of local importance of the Zhovkva Raion is in the village Velyki Hrybovychi. It is the St. Cosmas and St. Damian's Greek Catholic Church, built in 1897 (1927-M). Construction of the church was started in 1897 and been completed in the 1906. Church was consecrated by Metropolitan Archbishop Andrey Sheptytsky on April 22, 1908.

== Gallery ==
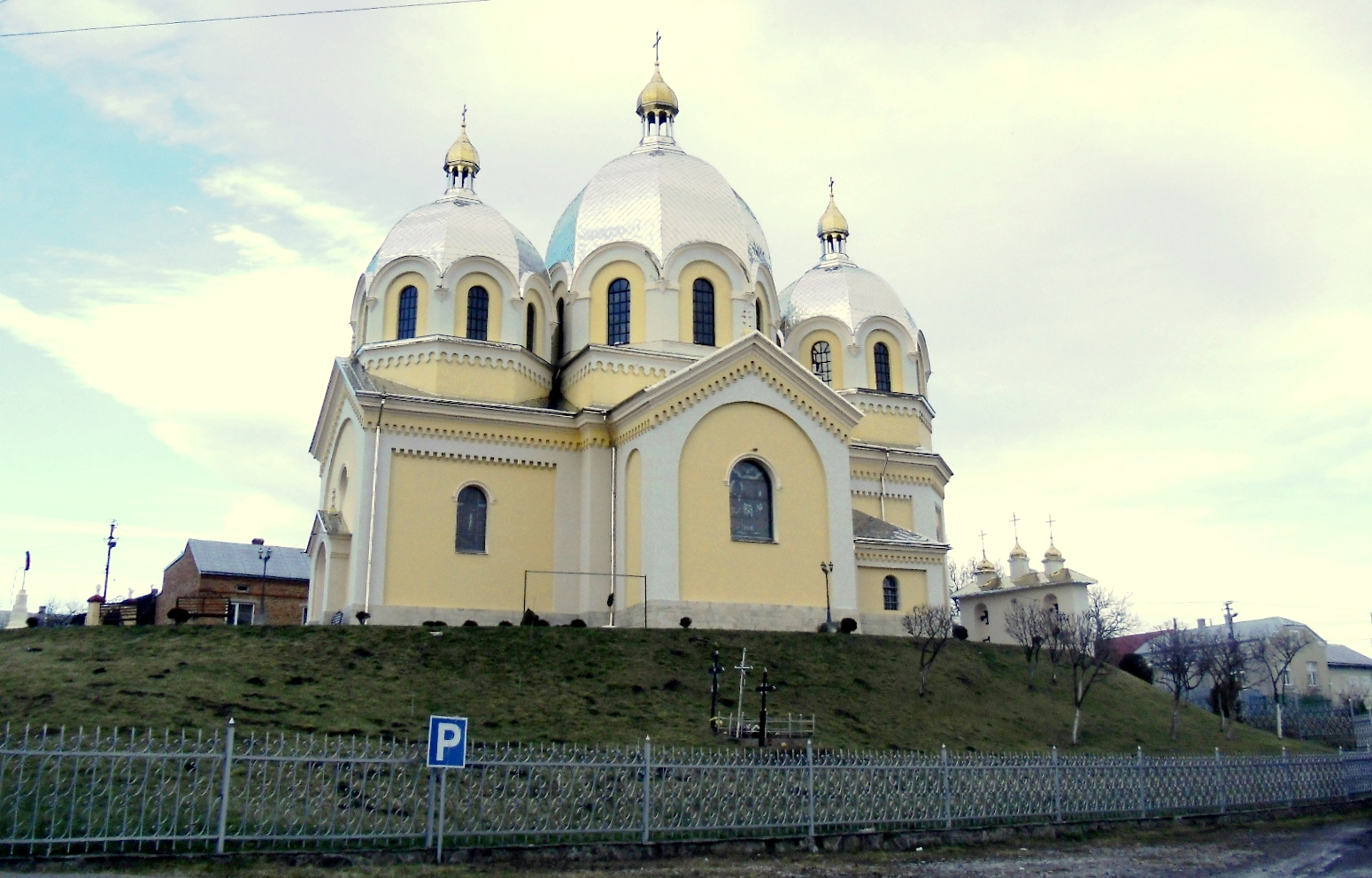
SS Cosmas and Damian Church

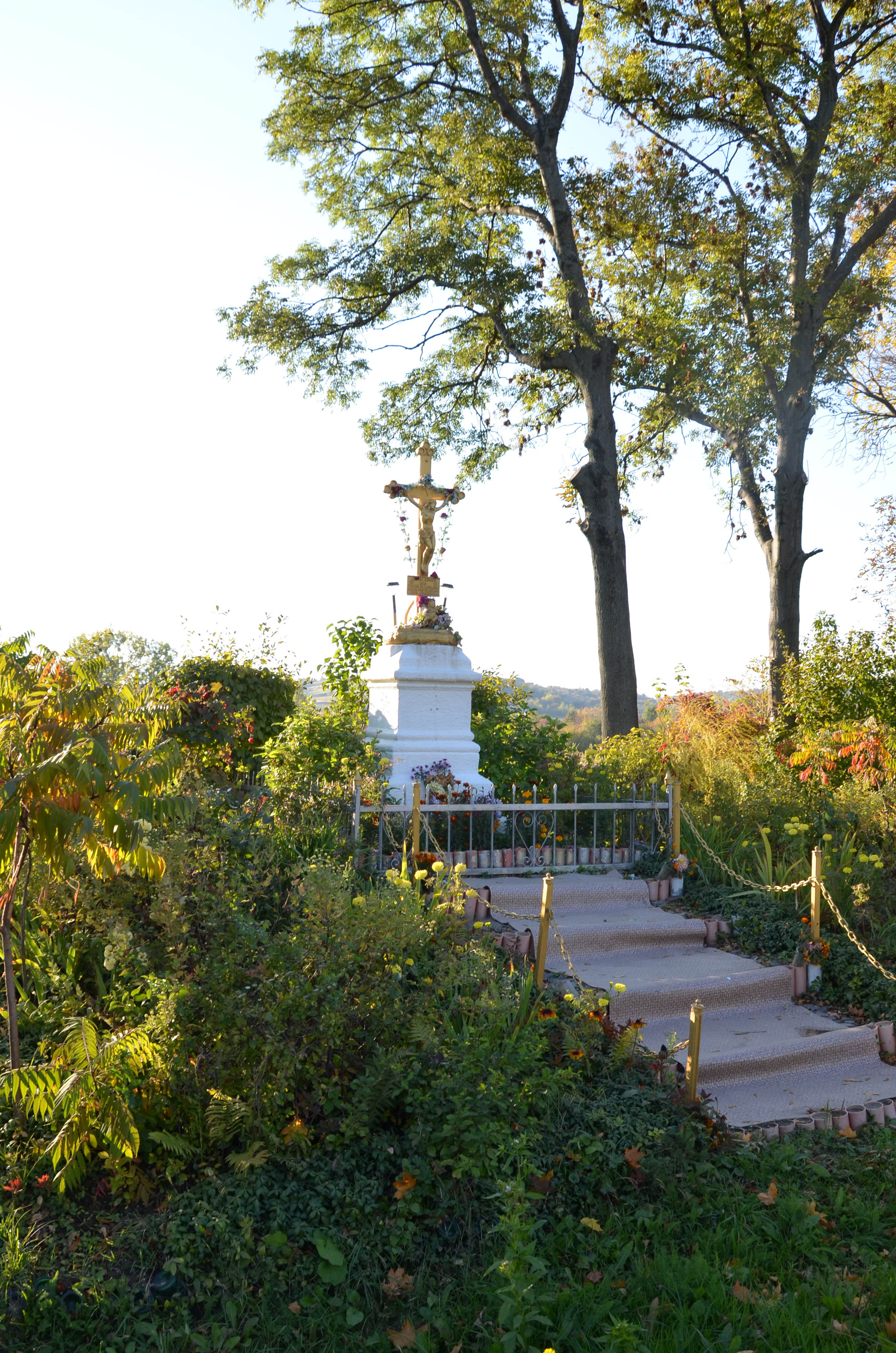
Cross in memory of the abolition of serfdom

== Literature ==
- Ukrainian: Історія міст і сіл УРСР : Львівська область. – К. : ГРУРЕ, 1968 р., сторінка 532
