= Zashkiv =

Zashkiv may refer to these villages, or to the Zashkiv festival in Ukraine.

- Zashkiv, Zhovkva Raion
- Zashkiv, Zolochiv Raion, Lviv Oblast.
- Zashkiv, Festival

== See also ==
- Zhashkiv, a city in Uman Raion, Cherkasy Oblast (province), Ukraine, previously included in Kyiv oblast
