= Riffmaster =

Ukrainian rock band

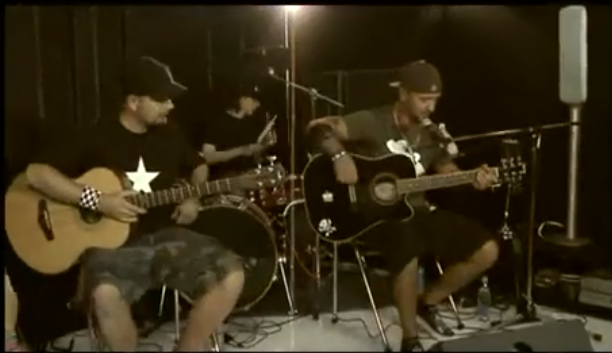

Riffmaster is a Ukrainian rock band founded by Andriy Antonenko in 2003.

== History ==
The band's history dates back to 2003. In 2007, the band's debut album, "Beautiful Day", was released. The album contains 13 songs.

In 2014, Riffmaster, together with Sashko Polozhynsky, recorded the song "Earth", about the war in Eastern Ukraine.

In 2015, the band's second studio album, "Chicken Kiev" (Ukrainian: «Котлета по-київськи»), was released. The album contains 13 songs.

In April 2017, a music video for the song "I Came Quietly, I Left Quietly" was released. It is a joint work of the Military Television of Ukraine, the creative team Riffmaster, and special forces soldiers. The Special Operations Forces Command chose this song as the unofficial anthem of the SSO.

On 1 March 2018, the band released a music video for the song "Sense", which contains philosophical and historical undertones. The music video depicts the participation of Ukrainian Cossacks in various battles. In January 2020, Moon Records released another music video for this song in support of the suspects in the Sheremet case and in protest against the law enforcement system, titled "What Is the 'Sense' of Justice?", featuring well-known Ukrainian public figures, performers, TV and radio hosts, producers, and actors such as Oleksandr Polozhynskyi, Oleg Sobchuk, Viktor Pryduvalov, Oleksandr Sydorenko, Serhii Kuzin, Zhenya Galich, Yurko Yurchenko, Andrii Yatsenko (Diezel), Sonya Sotnik, Oleg Mikhailuta, Valery Ananyev, Svitlana Orlichenko, Oleksandr Yarmola, Dmytro Shurov, Yuriy Makarov, Rimma Zyubina, and many others.
