= Andriy Antonenko =

Ukrainian poet, musician, and soldier

- Андрій Сергійович Антоненко
- Born: October 2, 1971 (age 55)
- Occupations: Soldier, singer
- Movement: #FreeRiff
- Awards: Honor. Glory. State.

Andriy Serhiiovych Antonenko (Ukrainian: Андрій Сергійович Антоненко; born 1971) is a Ukrainian poet, musician, and soldier who is the founder and frontman of the band Riffmaster. Antonenko was also a participant in the Russo-Ukrainian War. He has been under arrest since December 2019 on suspicion of plotting to assassinate Ukrainian journalist Pavel Sheremet.

== Biography ==
He was born in Kyiv. Antonenko's lived in the Jewish district of the city, in an area popularly known as the Jewish Bazaar or Evbaz for most of his childhood. According to his own words, he is half Jewish, his grandfather was a Polish Jew. He graduated from the music school with a degree in hammered dulcimer at the Cultural and Educational School (conductor of an amateur choir), a teacher of guitar.

In 1989 he founded the thrash metal band "Leprosorium", and participated in the music groups ADEM and DAZ Machine. As part of ADEM in 1991, he won a rock festival in Moscow, signing a contract to record in Los Angeles, but due to the coup and the dissolution of the Soviet Union, the band remained in Ukraine.

In 2003 he founded the solo project Riffmaster, where he played the role of composer, lyricist, guitarist and vocalist. In 2007 he released his debut album – "Beautiful Day", and in 2015 he released the album "Cutlet in Kiev".

Andrew's most famous song is "He came quietly, left quietly", which is considered the unofficial anthem of the Special Operations Forces of the Armed Forces.

=== In the war ===
In May 2015, Andriy and Oleksandr Polozhynskyi, the soloist of the Tartak band, performed for the Ukrainian Armed Forces fighters at the forefront of the Russian-Ukrainian war. He later went to the front to serve under a contract, and took part in fighting in the "hot spots" in the Donbas. He suffered a leg injury and spent a long time in treatment.

== Criminal proceedings ==
On December 12, 2019, Antonenko was arrested on suspicion of plotting to assassinate prominent Ukrainian journalist Pavel Sheremet on July 20, 2016. He was accused of organizing the murder, which, according to the police, was committed by him together with Yana Duhar and Yulia Kuzmenko. According to the text of the suspicion, law enforcement officers believe that Antonenko, "fascinated by ultranationalist ideas, cultivating the greatness of the Aryan race, dividing society on the principle of nationality, seeking to make their views the object of public attention, taking action to attract public attention... decided to form an organized group to assassinate the journalist and radio host Sheremet".

The case is being heard in Kyiv Pechersk District Court, and the infamous Serhiy Vovk, who was previously a judge in two cases that were recognized by the European Parliament and the European Court of Human Rights in 2012 as politically motivated, was appointed judge. In 2015–2016, Vovk was removed from the office by the High Qualifications Commission of Judges, and was removed five times in all. He was suspected of abusing his official position and deliberately violating the law, making a knowingly unjust decision in a civil case, illegally depriving a citizen of the right to own property belonging to him. The prosecutor in the case is Olexander Lukashenko, who did not pass re-certification. According to an investigation published in 2017, the value of Lukashenko's estates is much higher than the income received by the militiaman and his family. In particular, the prosecutor was able to buy an apartment in Kyiv for ₴5.

On December 8, 2019, during a pre-trial hearing, Antonenko denied the investigator's allegations and said he had nothing to do with the case, and said: "If it is leaked from me – or on my behalf – that I pleaded guilty, understand that there was torture". Antonenko also noted that he was born in a Jewish district and that his grandfather was a Polish Jew, so accusations of right-wing or left-wing views are offensive to him.

He also cited a number of differences between his physique and appearance and the physique and appearance of a man in videos provided by the investigation and noted that at the time of the murder he was not acquainted with people suspected by police of involvement in Sheremet's murder. Nevertheless, the Pechersk court remanded Antonenko in custody for two months without the possibility of bail. On December 17, the investigator tried to interrogate Antonenko, but he refused to testify, calling the investigation in the case biased.

A number of activists and volunteers called on everyone to support Antonenko, Dugar and Kuzmenko. They perceived the statement of the Ministry of Internal Affairs as purposeful discrediting of volunteers and volunteers. On December 17, 2019 in Kharkiv near the State Unitary Enterprise of the National Police of the region a concert in support of Antonenko was held.

On December 20, Antonenko filed a lawsuit against TRK Ukraina, Arsen Avakov, Yevhen Koval, Volodymyr Zelenskyy, and Ruslan Ryaboshapka, demanding protection of honor and dignity. Andriy accused these individuals of insulting the presumption of innocence at a briefing on his detention, accusing Antonenko of complicity in Sheremet's murder without a court order.

On December 27, the Kyiv Court of Appeal postponed Antonenko's detention until January 8. After the publication of recordings of Antonenko's conversations, his defense denied any connection between Andriy and the SSU.

On February 7, 2020, Antonenko stated that his lawyers had not yet received the case file for review, so he refused to give any evidence. On March 12, the Kyiv Court of Appeals denied Antonenko's defense, leaving him in custody until April 4.

On May 21, materials on Andriy Antonenko, Yulia Kuzmenko, and Yana Duhar were separated into separate criminal proceedings and suspicions were changed. Antonenko has not been involved in the case since, as the organizer of the crime.

On July 13, the Kyiv Court of Appeal ordered Antonenko to remain in custody until at least July 23. On July 18, Kyiv's infamous Pechersk court extended Antonenko's arrest for at least two months. On September 28, a jury refused to release Antonenko from custody.

On October 6, the Kyiv Court of Appeals remanded Antonenko in custody, sparking clashes between his supporters and security forces outside the court.

== Awards ==
- Medal "Honor. Glory. State "(September 26, 2017) – for courage, patriotism, high civic position, heroism, military service in defending the independence, sovereignty and territorial integrity of Ukraine.
