= Kuligowski =

Kuligowski, feminine: Kuligowska, is a Polish surname. It is a toponymic surname derived from any of places named Kuligów, Kuligowo, or Kuligi. Notable people with the surname include:

- Adam Kuligowski (born 1955), Polish chess player
- Eddie Kuligowski (1946–2021), French photographer
- Erica Kuligowski, American social research scientist
- Joanna Kuligowska (born 1979), Polish volleyball player

== See also ==
- Kulikowski
