= Kulykiv =

Rural locality in Lviv Oblast, Ukraine

Kulykiv Куликів
- Rural settlement
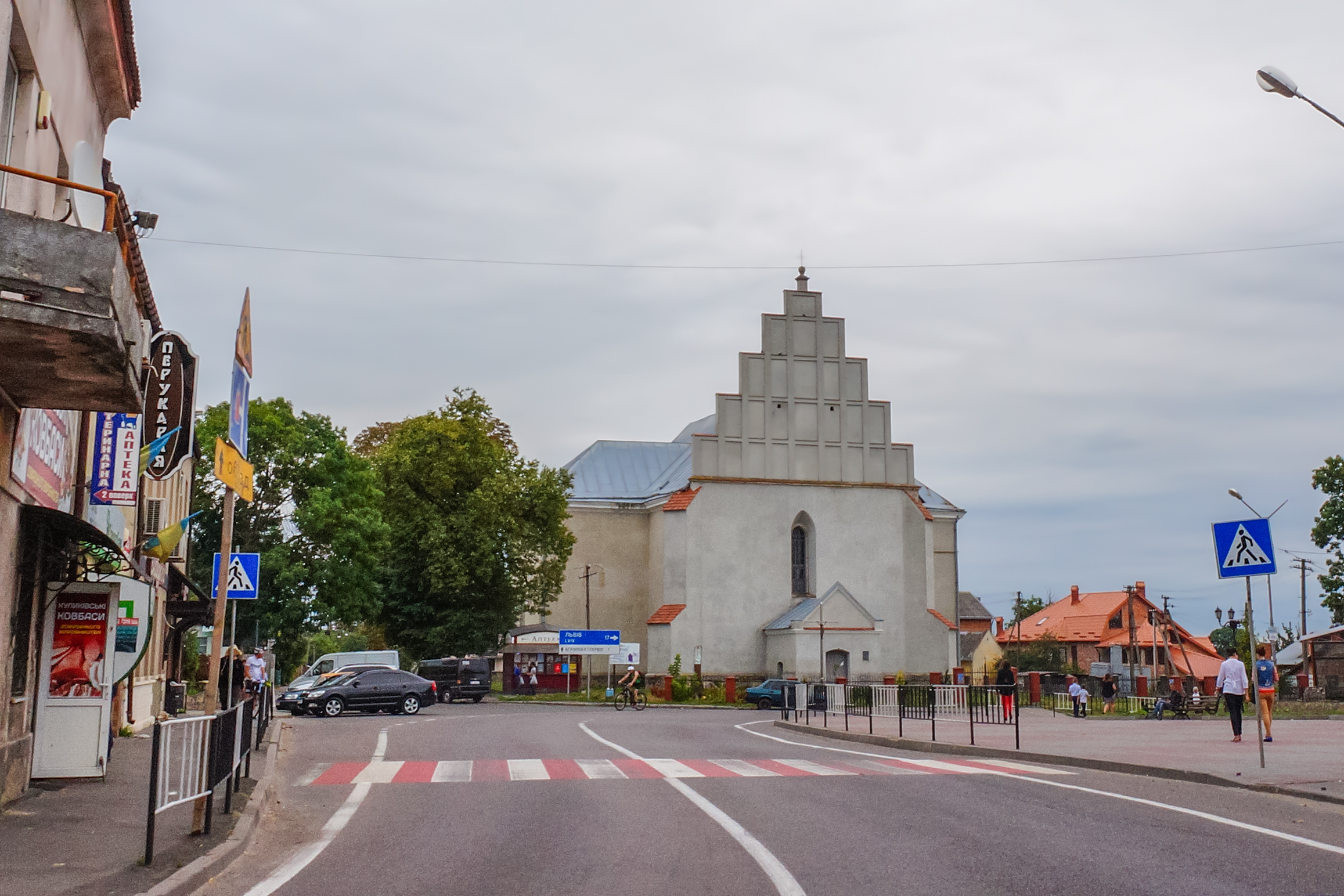
- Town centre with the Roman Catholic church

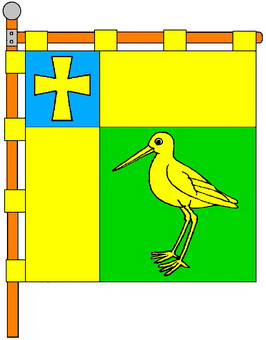
- Flag Coat of arms

- Location in Lviv Oblast Location in Ukraine
- Coordinates: 49°59′00″N 24°04′34″E
- Country: Ukraine
- Oblast: Lviv Oblast
- Raion: Lviv Raion
- Hromada: Kulykiv settlement hromada

Population (2022)
  - Total: 4,092
- Time zone: UTC+2 (EET)
  - Summer (DST): UTC+3 (EEST)

Kulykiv (Ukrainian: Куликів; Polish: Kulików) is a rural settlement in Lviv Raion, Lviv Oblast, western Ukraine. It is located about 15 kilometres (9.3 mi) north of the city of Lviv. Kulykiv hosts the administration of Kulykiv settlement hromada, one of the hromadas of Ukraine. Population: 4,092 (2022 estimate).

== History ==
According to archaeological data, a fortified settlement emerged in the northeastern part of modern-day Kulykiv during the Rus' period in the 11-12th centuries. It served as a defensive outpost on the route to Lviv. The first written mention of Kulykiv dates from 1399, when Galician bishop Jakub established the wooden Catholic Church of Holy Trinity in the settlement. During the 15th century Kulykiv was also known as Boshch; its modern name likely derives from wader birds (Ukrainian: кулик), which were abundant in the area.

According to a patent issued by king Władysław II Jagiełło, on 23 February 1431 Kulykiv was granted into the ownership of Jan of Koniecpol. During that time the town had a castle surrounded by an earthen wall. Another wall, made of wood, was built around the settlement itself. In 1569 Kulykiv received Magdeburg rights. Previously owned by the Kulikowski and Herburt-Odnowski families, during the 17th century Kulykiv came in possession of Jan Sobieski, who in 1674 was elected King of Poland and Grand Duke of Lithuania. Under his ownership the town became a centre of carpet production, employing Turkish and Tatar prisoners of war. After Sobieski, the Kulykiv was inherited by the Murawski family, and in 1743 became the property of Michał Radziwiłł.

Under the Austrian rule in the early 19th century the Roman Catholic cemetery in Kulykiv was closed down, and a road was built over one of its section. Human burials and artifacts from the 15-16th centuries were discovered during road works at the site in 2026.

Until 18 July 2020, Kulykiv belonged to Zhovkva Raion. The raion was abolished in July 2020 as part of the administrative reform of Ukraine, which reduced the number of raions of Lviv Oblast to seven. The area of Zhovkva Raion was merged into Lviv Raion.

Until 26 January 2024, Kulykiv was designated urban-type settlement. On this day, a new law entered into force which abolished this status, and Kulykiv became a rural settlement.

== Economy ==
=== Industry ===
Before the Second World War Kulykiv served as a centre of handicrafts such as tanning and production of shoes.

=== Transportation ===
Kulykiv railway station is in the selo of Mervychi, about 2 kilometres (1.2 mi) west of the settlement. It is on the railway connecting Lviv via Zhovkva with Rava-Ruska. There is infrequent passenger traffic.

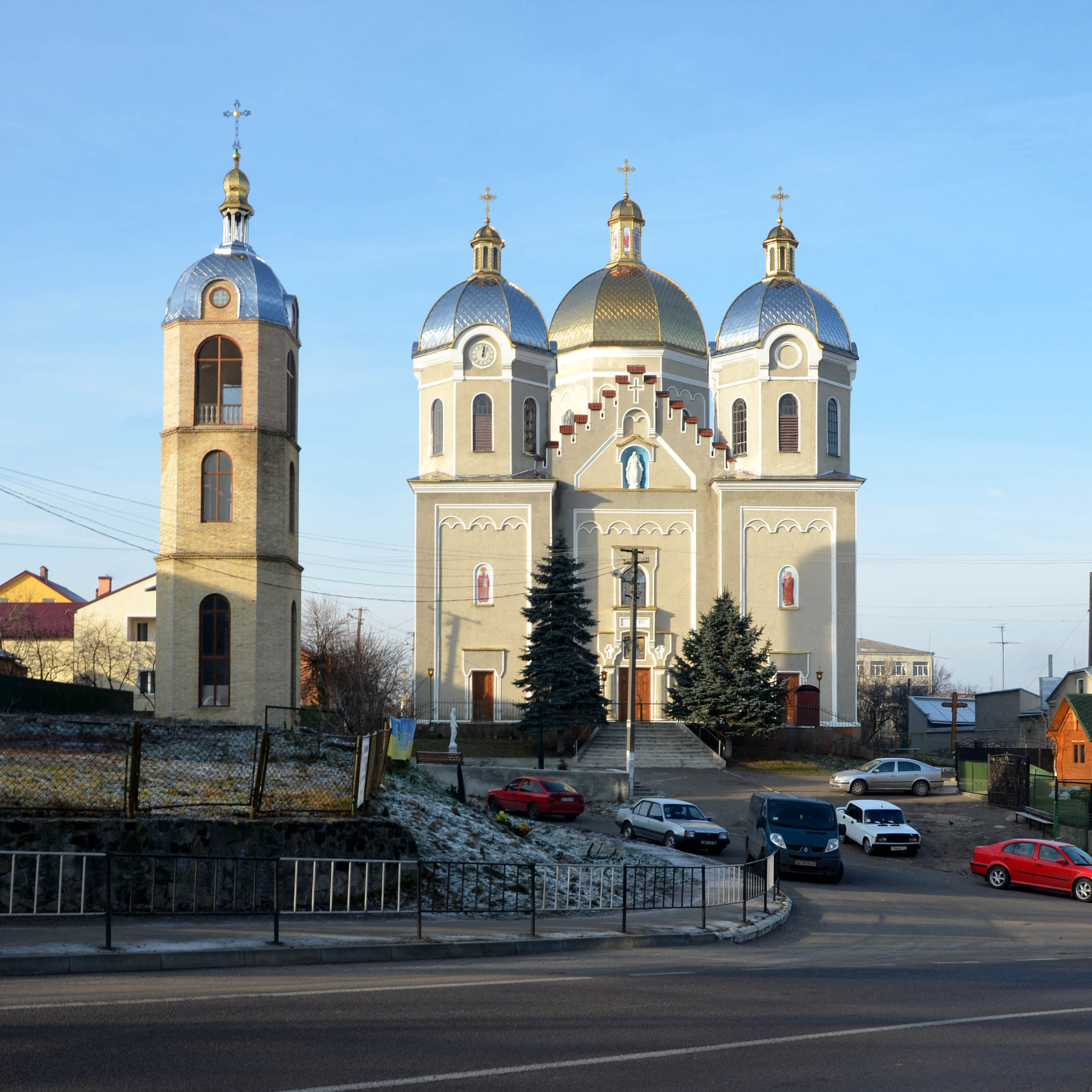
Assumption Church

The settlement is on Highway M09 which connects Lviv with Rava-Ruska, crosses into Poland and continues to Zamość.

== Places of interest ==
- Roman Catholic Church of the Holy Trinity - Gothic stone church erected in 1538 on the site of a previous wooden church founded in 1399;
- Parish Church of the Assumption of Virgin Mary - stone church erected in 1901 on the site of the original church first mentioned in 1515 and burned down in 1799.

== Famous people ==
- Sylvester Lepkyi (1845–1901), Ukrainian writer, religious and public figure
- Bohdan Stupka (1941–2012), popular Ukrainian actor and minister of culture of Ukraine
