= Maheriv =

Rural locality in Lviv Oblast, Ukraine

Maheriv Магерів
- Rural settlement
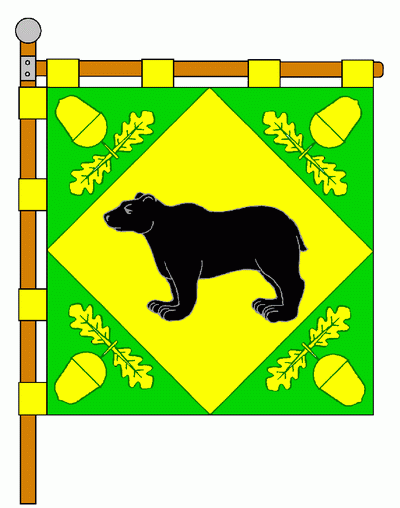
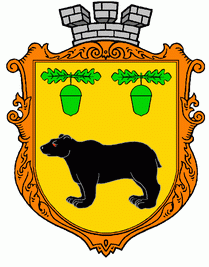
- Flag Coat of arms

- Location in Lviv Oblast Location in Ukraine
- Coordinates: 50°06′34″N 23°42′00″E
- Country: Ukraine
- Oblast: Lviv Oblast
- Raion: Lviv Raion
- Hromada: Maheriv settlement hromada

Population (2022)
  - Total: 1,959
- Time zone: UTC+2 (EET)
  - Summer (DST): UTC+3 (EEST)

Maheriv (Ukrainian: Магерів; Polish: Magierów) is a rural settlement in Lviv Raion, Lviv Oblast, western Ukraine. It is located approximately 30 kilometres (19 mi) northeast of the city of Lviv. Maheriv hosts the administration of Dobrosyn-Maheriv settlement hromada, one of the hromadas of Ukraine. Population: 1,959 (2022 estimate).

== History ==
Until 18 July 2020, Maheriv belonged to Zhovkva Raion. The raion was abolished in July 2020 as part of the administrative reform of Ukraine, which reduced the number of raions of Lviv Oblast to seven. The area of Zhovkva Raion was merged into Lviv Raion.

Until 26 January 2024, Maheriv was designated urban-type settlement. On this day, a new law entered into force which abolished this status, and Maheriv became a rural settlement.

== Economy ==
=== Transportation ===
Dobrosyn railway station is about 10 kilometres (6.2 mi) east of the settlement. It is on the railway connecting Lviv via Zhovkva with Rava-Ruska. There is infrequent passenger traffic.

The settlement has access to Highway M09 which connects Lviv with Rava-Ruska, crosses into Poland and continues to Zamość.
