= Kulikowski =

Kulikowski, feminine: Kulikowska, is a Polish surname. It may be variously transliterated as Kulikowsky, Kulikovsky, etc. (Russian: Куликовский, Ukrainian: Куликовський) It is a toponymic surname derived from any of places named Kulikówka, Kulików, or Kulikowo. Notable people with the surname include:

- Lidia Kulikovski (born 1951), Moldovan librarian and bibliographer
- Marcelina Kulikowska (1872–1910), Polish playwright, poet, feminist, teacher, naturalist, reporter
- Michael Kulikowski (born 1970), American historian
- Mykola Ovsianiko-Kulikovsky (1768–1846), Ukrainian composer
- Nikolai Kulikovsky (1811–1958), second husband of Grand Duchess Olga Alexandrovna of Russia
- Olga Kulikovsky (1882–1960)
- Traudl Kulikowsky (born 1943), German actress
- Zofia Weigl (née Kulikowska; c. 1885–1940), Polish biologist, a collaborator in search vaccine for typhus

== See also ==
- 2497 Kulikovskij
- Kuligowski
