= Lysynychi (village) =

Village in Lviv Oblast, Ukraine

Lysynychi Лисиничі
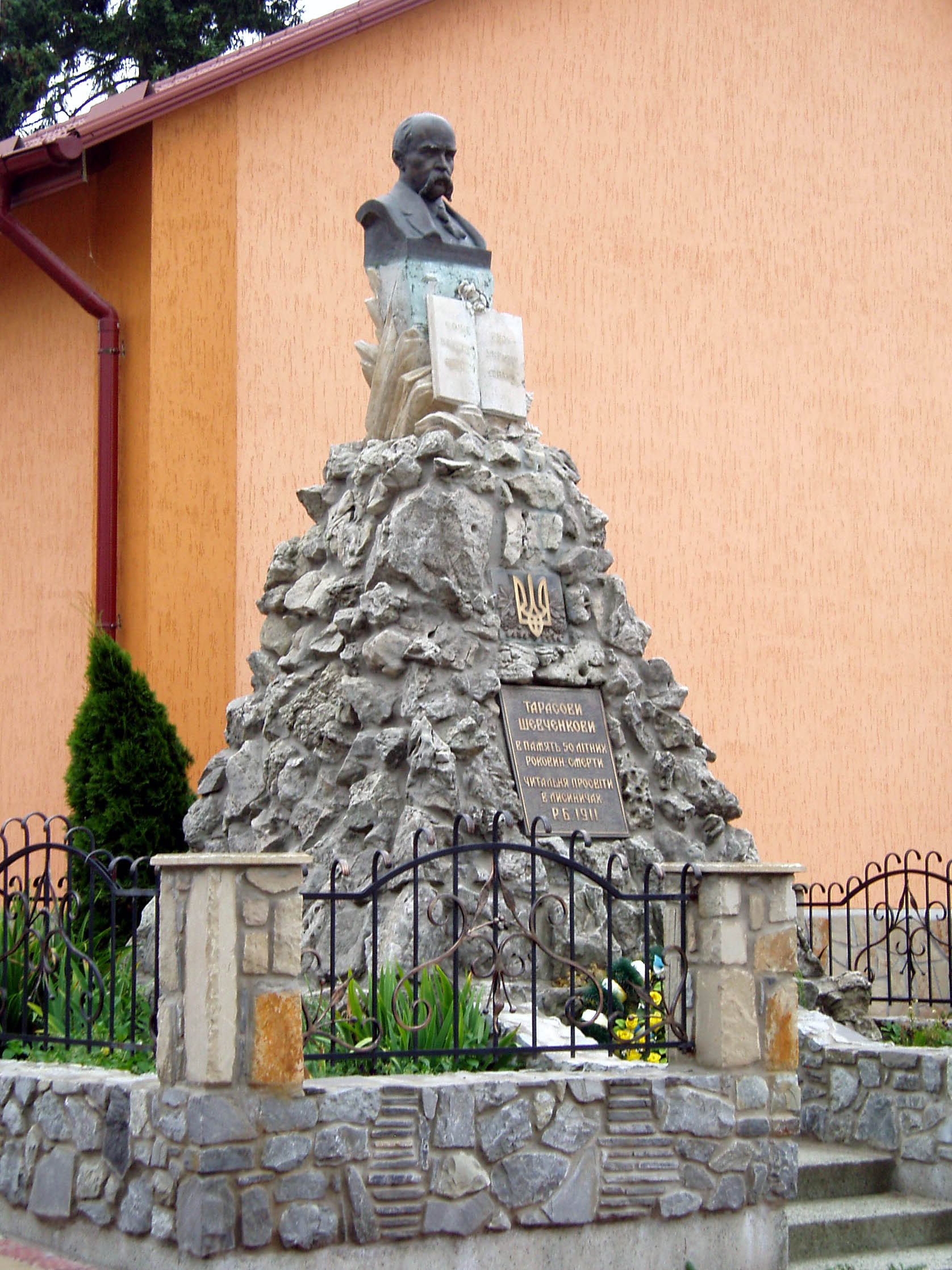
- Bust of Taras Shevchenko, 1911

- Location in Lviv Oblast Lysynychi (Ukraine)
- Coordinates: 49°50′17″N 24°7′11″E
- Country: Ukraine
- Oblast: Lviv Oblast
- Raion: Lviv Raion
- Hromada: Lviv urban hromada
- Time zone: UTC+2 (EET)
  - Summer (DST): UTC+3 (EEST)
- Postal code: 81126

Lysynychi (Ukrainian: Лисиничі) is a village in the Lviv urban hromada of the Lviv Raion of Lviv Oblast in Ukraine.

== History ==
The first mention of Lysynychi in written sources dates back to 1411, when Mycko of Kulykiv founded the Saint Michael Chapel in Lviv and donated it, along with the village of Lysynychi, to the Dominicans of Lviv. The owner of part of the village was Boyar Benko (Benedykt) of Kukhar.

On 19 July 2020, as a result of the administrative-territorial reform and liquidation of the Pustomyty Raion, the village became part of the Lviv Raion.

== Religion ==
- Saint Paraskeva Church (1889, Ukrainian Greek Catholic Church),
- Church of the Intercession (2020, Orthodox Church of Ukraine).

== Monuments ==
On the initiative of the Lysynychi reading room Prosvita and with funds from the village community, a monument to Taras Shevchenko was erected in Lysynychi — the first public monument to the Kobzar in Ukraine. The opening took place on September 17, 1911, on the 50th anniversary of the poet's death. Initially, the monument looked like a pyramid crowned with a cross with a porcelain portrait of the Kobzar installed on it and resembled the original grave of Taras Shevchenko on Taras Hill. On the 100th anniversary of the poet's death, the cross and portrait were removed, and a bronze bust was installed at the top of the pyramid.

== Bibliography ==
- "Lesienice (po rusku Łysenyczi)". Geographical Dictionary of the Kingdom of Poland (in Polish). 5. Warszawa: Kasa im. Józefa Mianowskiego. 1884. p. 154.
