= Rudno, Ukraine =

Rural settlement in Lviv Oblast, Ukraine

Rudno Рудно Rudno (in Polish)
- Rural settlement
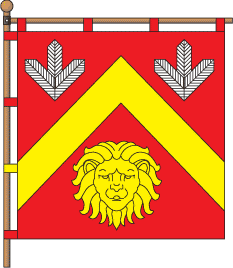
- Flag Coat of arms

- Location within Lviv Oblast Location within Ukraine
- Coordinates: 49°50′24″N 23°52′40″E
- Country: Ukraine
- Oblast: Lviv Oblast
- Raion: Lviv Raion
- Hromada: Lviv urban hromada
- Established: 1461

Area
  - Total: 4.19 km^{2} (1.62 sq mi)

Population (2022)
  - Total: 7,502
  - Density: 1,790/km^{2} (4,640/sq mi)
- Postal code: 79493
- Area code: (+380) 32

Rudno (Ukrainian: Рудно; Polish: Rudno), before 2025 known as Rudne (Рудне), is a rural settlement in Lviv Raion, Lviv Oblast, western Ukraine. It belongs to Lviv urban hromada, one of the hromadas of Ukraine. The population was 7,502 (2022 estimate).

== Location ==
Rudne is located 11 kilometers west of the Lviv city center. The Lviv Ring Road is 1 kilometer from the village. The Lviv-Mostyska Road passes through the village.

== History ==
Between 1774 and 1918 it was part of Austrian Galicia. After the end of World War I Briukhovychi became part of Lwów Powiat in Lwów Voivodeship, part of Poland. In 1939 it was annexed by the Soviet Union. It was given the status of an urban-type settlement in 1940.

Rudne was occupied by German troops during World War II from 1941 to 1944.

Until 18 July 2020, Rudne belonged to Lviv Municipality. The municipality was abolished in July 2020 as part of the administrative reform of Ukraine, which reduced the number of raions of Lviv Oblast to seven. The area of Lviv Municipality was merged into the newly established Lviv Raion. On 26 January 2024, a new law entered into force which abolished the status of urban-type settlement, and Rudne became a rural settlement. On 15 June 2025, the rural settlement returned its historic name Rudno.

== Notable residents ==
- Yevhen Nahirnyi (1885–1951), Ukrainian architect
