= Lviv urban hromada =

Urban hromada in Lviv Oblast, Ukraine

Lviv urban hromada Львівська міська громада
- Hromada
- Interactive map of Lviv urban hromada
- Country: Ukraine
- Oblast: Lviv
- Raion: Lviv
- Admin. center: Lviv

Area
  - Total: 315.6 km^{2} (121.9 sq mi)

Population (2020)
  - Total: 783,065
  - Density: 2,481/km^{2} (6,426/sq mi)
- CATOTTG code: UA46060250000025047
- Settlements: 20
- Cities: 3
- Rural settlements: 2
- Villages: 15
- Website: city-adm.lviv.ua/lmr/lviv-community/

Lviv urban territorial hromada (Ukrainian: Львівська міська територіальна громада, romanized: Lvivska miska terytorialna hromada) is a hromada (municipality) in Ukraine's Lviv Oblast, in Lviv Raion. The hromada's administrative centre is the city of Lviv.

The area of the hromada is 311.4 square kilometres (120.2 mi^{2}), and the population is 777,234 (2022 estimate).

Until 18 July 2020, the hromada belonged to the city of Lviv which was incorporated as a city of oblast significance and the center of Lviv Municipality. The municipality was abolished in July 2020 as part of the administrative reform of Ukraine, which reduced the number of raions of Lviv Oblast to seven. The area of Lviv Municipality was merged into the newly established Lviv Raion.

== Settlements ==
The Lviv urban hromada contains three cities (Lviv, Vynnyky, and Dubliany), two urban-type settlements (Briukhovychi and Rudno), and fifteen villages:

- Velyki Hrybovychi
- Volia-Homuletska
- Hriada
- Zavadiv
- Zarudtsi
- Zashkiv
- Zbyranka
- Lysynychi
- Malekhiv
- Mali Hrybovychi
- Mali Pidlisky
- Pidbirtsi
- Pidriasne
- Riasne-Ruske
- Sytykhiv
