= Dobrosyn-Maheriv settlement hromada =

Hromada in Lviv Oblast, Ukraine

Dobrosyn-Maheriv settlement hromada Добросинсько-Магерівська селищна громада
- Hromada
- Interactive map of Dobrosyn-Maheriv settlement hromada
- Country: Ukraine
- Oblast: Lviv Oblast
- Raion: Lviv Raion
- Administrative center: Dobrosyn

Area
  - Total: 2,339 km^{2} (903 sq mi)

Population (2021)
  - Total: 16,154
  - Density: 6.906/km^{2} (17.89/sq mi)
- CATOTTG code: UA46060110000011684
- Settlements: 36
- Rural settlements: 1
- Villages: 35
- Website: dmg.gov.ua

Dobrosyn-Maheriv settlement hromada (Ukrainian: Добросинсько-Магерівська селищна громада) is a hromada in Ukraine, in Lviv Raion of Lviv Oblast. The administrative center is the village of Dobrosyn.

== Settlements ==
The hromada consists of 1 rural settlement (Maheriv) and 35 villages:

- Babii
- Byshkiv
- Birky
- Bir-Kunynskyi
- Bobroidy
- Buchmy
- Velyke Peredmistia
- Vikhti
- Horodzhiv
- Hrynchuky
- Dobrosyn
- Dumychi
- Dumychi
- Zamok
- Zaryshche
- Zubeiky
- Kamiana Hora
- Kachmari
- Kipti
- Kulynychi
- Kunyn
- Lavrykiv
- Lushchyky
- Mavdryky
- Myliavo
- Monastyrok
- Okopy
- Panchyshchyny
- Pyly
- Pyriatyn
- Pidderevenka
- Pidlissia
- Poharysko
- Khytreiky
- Tsytulia
