= Tartak (band) =

Tartak Тартак (Ukrainian)
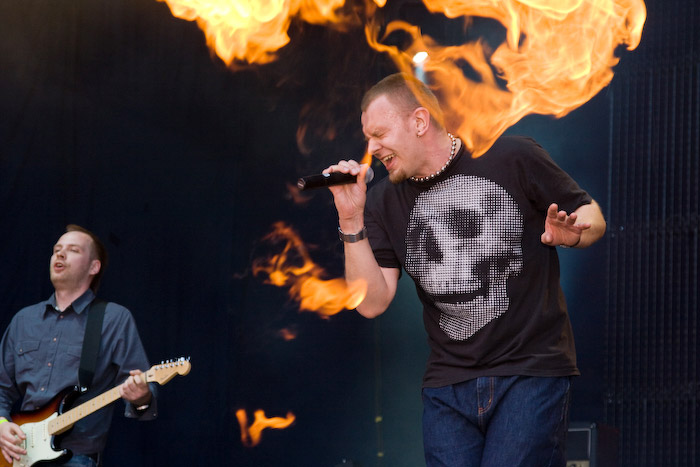
- Tartak performing

Background information
- Origin: Lutsk, Ukraine
- Genres: Alternative rock, rap-rock, punk rock, rapcore, pop punk, funk
- Years active: 1996–present
- Labels: Moon Records; Lavina Music
- Members: Oleksandr Polozhynskyi; Vitaliy Pavlyshyn; Andriy Blahun; Eduard Kosorapov; Dmytro Chuyev; Anton Yehorov
- Website: http://www.tartak.com.ua

Tartak (Ukrainian: Тартак [tɐrˈtɑk]; lit. 'Woodsaw') is a rapcore and alternative hip hop crossover band from Ukraine. It mixes styles of guitar rock, hip-hop and dance music.

== History ==
Sashko Polozhynskyi and Vasily Zinkevich, Jr. founded the group in the Fall of 1996 in Lutsk, Ukraine. The name of the group, Tartak, means a woodworking company.

The group has released five albums with a total of 74 songs and 9 videos. Tartak's songs "Ni Ya Ne Tu Kokhav" and "Stilnykove Kohannia" stayed on the Top 40 charts for 144 days and 75 days respectively. Tartak was one of the bands that performed during the events of the Orange Revolution.

On Independence Day of Ukraine 2020 President Volodymyr Zelenskyy awarded Polozhynskyi the Order of Merit. Polozhynskyi renounced it and stated that the award should have been given to the five veterans of the War in Donbas that were arrested in December 2019 on the suspicion of killing journalist Pavel Sheremet. According to Polozhynskyi there was no "really substantial proof of their guilt" and they had been "suffering from lawlessness for more than six months." He blamed Zelenskyy for his "participation a briefing where people were unjustifiably called murderers - without trial, without investigation, without evidence."

=== Origin and albums ===
- In 1996 Tartak won the first prize in the dance music genre at the Chervona Ruta Festival.
- At the end of 1997, Oleksandr Polozhynskyi and Vasily Zinkevich, Jr., who formed the band at the time, were joined by Andrii Blahun — keyboardist — and guitarist Andrii "Muha" Samoilo.
- At the end of 1999, DJ Valentyn Matiyuk joined the band, and at the beginning of 2000, Tartak recorded its debut album, Demo hrafichnyi vybukh (Demo Graphic Blast).
- In March 2003 Tartak released a second album, System of Nerves.
- In June 2004 a third album, Music Letter of Happiness, was released.
- Opir materialiv (Material Resistance) was uploaded for free on New Year's Day, January 1, 2010.
- The next album was Simka.

== Discography ==
=== Studio albums ===
- 2001 - Demo hrafichnyi vybukh (Демографічний вибух)
- 2003 - Systema nerviv (Система нервів)
- 2004 - Muzychnyi lyst shchastia (Музичний лист щастя)
- 2005 - Huliai-Horod (Гуляйгород)
- 2006 - Slozy ta sopli (Сльози та соплі)
- 2010 - Opir materialiv (Опір матеріалів)
- 2012 - Simka (Сімка)
- 2015 - Vvichnist (Ввічність)

=== Remix albums ===
- 2005 - Pershyi komertsiynyi (Перший комерційний))
- 2007 - Kofein (Кофеїн)
- 2010 - Nazbyralosia na 2010 (Назбиралося на 2010) - remixes, remakes, unreleased

=== Singles ===
- 2006 - "Ukrayino, zabyvai!" (Україно, забивай!)

=== Compilations ===
- 2006 - Zaklipani pisni abo bachyly ochi shcho kupuvaly (Закліпані пісні або бачили очі що купували)
- 2007 - Dlia tiekh kto v puti (Для тєх кто в путі)
