= Kulykiv settlement hromada =

Hromada in Lviv Oblast, Ukraine

- Hromada
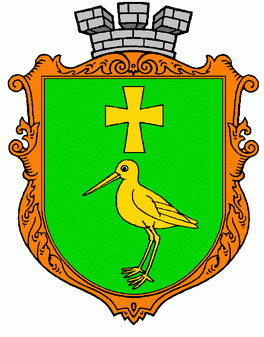
- Seal
- Interactive map of Kulykiv settlement hromada
- Country: Ukraine
- Oblast: Lviv Oblast
- Raion: Lviv Raion
- Admin. center: Kulykiv

Area
  - Total: 1,142 km^{2} (441 sq mi)

Population (2021)
  - Total: 11,654
  - Density: 10.20/km^{2} (26.43/sq mi)
- CATOTTG code: UA46060230000093092
- Settlements: 17
- Rural settlements: 1
- Villages: 16
- Website: kulykiv-gromada.gov.ua

Kulykiv settlement hromada (Ukrainian: Куликівська селищна громада) is a hromada in Ukraine, in Lviv Raion of Lviv Oblast. The administrative center is the rural settlement of Kulykiv.

== Settlements ==
The hromada consists of 1 rural settlement (Kulykiv) and 16 villages:

- Artasiv
- Velykyi Doroshiv
- Vidniv
- Hrebintsi
- Zvertiv
- Kosteiv
- Kosheliv
- Malyi Doroshiv
- Mervychi
- Mohyliany
- Nadychi
- Nove Selo
- Peremyvky
- Smerekiv
- Stroniatyn
- Sulymiv
