= Zashkiv, Lviv Raion, Lviv Oblast =

Village in Ukraine

Zashkiv Зашків
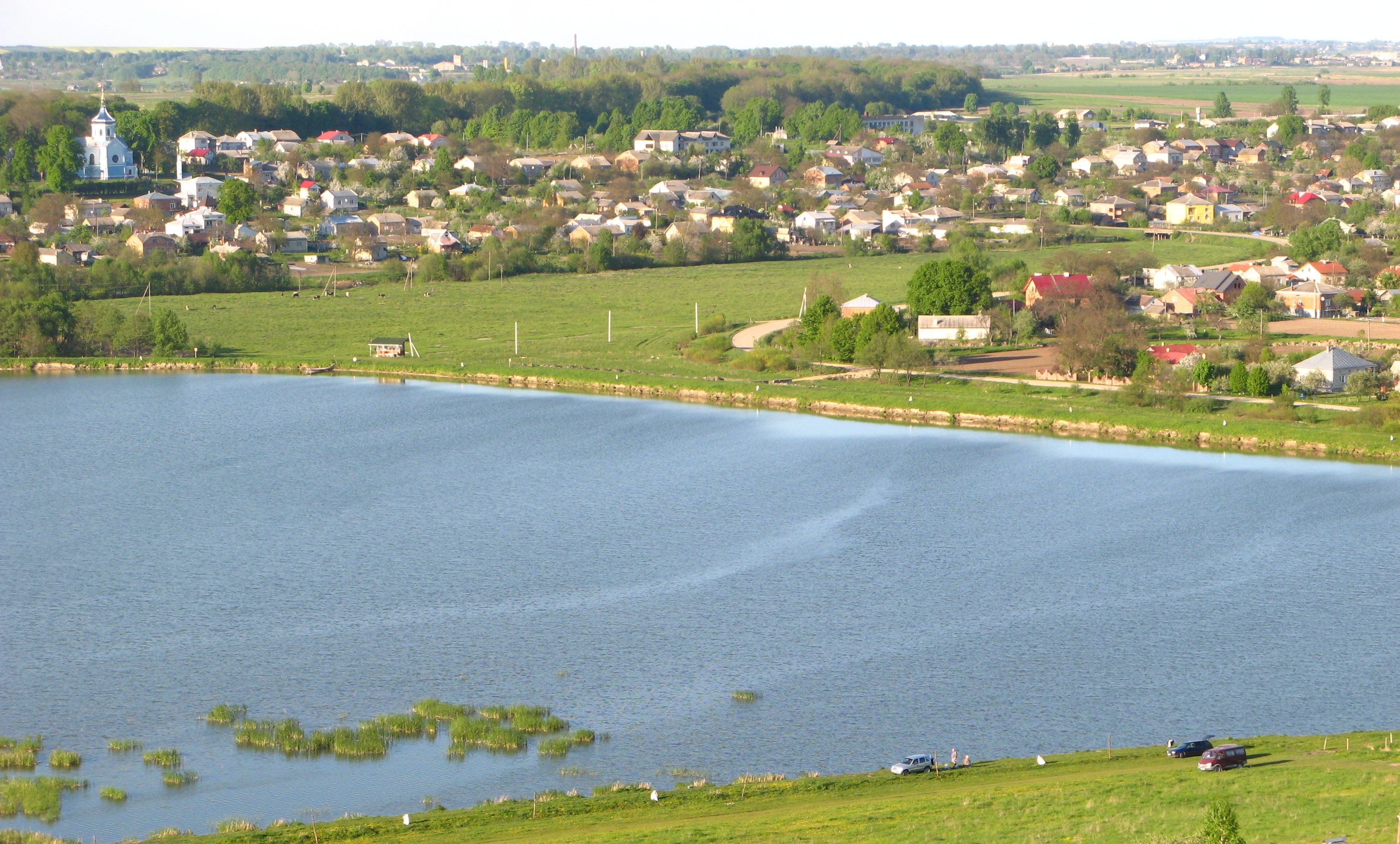
- General view of the village

- Location within Ukraine Location within Lviv Oblast
- Coordinates: 49°57′06″N 23°59′39″E
- Country: Ukraine
- Oblast: Lviv Oblast
- Raion: Lviv Raion
- Hromada: Lviv urban hromada

Area
  - Total: 15.91 km^{2} (6.14 sq mi)

Population (2023 census)
  - Total: 1,462
  - Density: 88.68/km^{2} (229.7/sq mi)
- Time zone: UTC+2 (EET)
  - Summer (DST): UTC+3 (EEST)
- Postal code: 80375
- Area code: +380 3252

Zashkiv (Ukrainian: Зашків; Polish: Zaszków; German: Saschkiw) is a village not far from Lviv in Lviv Raion (district) of Lviv Oblast (region) in western Ukraine. It belongs to Lviv urban hromada, one of the hromadas of Ukraine.

== History ==
First written mention comes from the 1377 (14th century). Then belonged to the Polish–Lithuanian Commonwealth, from 1772 until 1918 to Austrian (Habsburg monarchy, Austrian Empire, Austria-Hungary) empires, in 1918–1919 to West Ukrainian People's Republic. From 1991 belonged to Ukraine.

Reading room of Ukrainian society Prosvita operated in the village.

Until 18 July 2020, Zashkiv belonged to Zhovkva Raion. The raion was abolished in July 2020 as part of the administrative reform of Ukraine, which reduced the number of raions of Lviv Oblast to seven. The area of Zhovkva Raion was merged into Lviv Raion.

== Attractions ==
- Church of St. Michael the Archangel (1908)

== People ==
- Yevhen Konovalets, a military commander of the UNR army and the leader of the Organization of Ukrainian Nationalists between 1929 and 1938.
- Myron Konovalets, brother of Yevhen Konovalets, buried at the Munich Waldfriedhof.
