= Lutsk National Technical University =

Public university in Lutsk, Ukraine

Coordinates: 50.7258°N 25.2960°E

- Луцький національний технічний університет Lutskyi natsionalnyi tekhnichnyi universytet
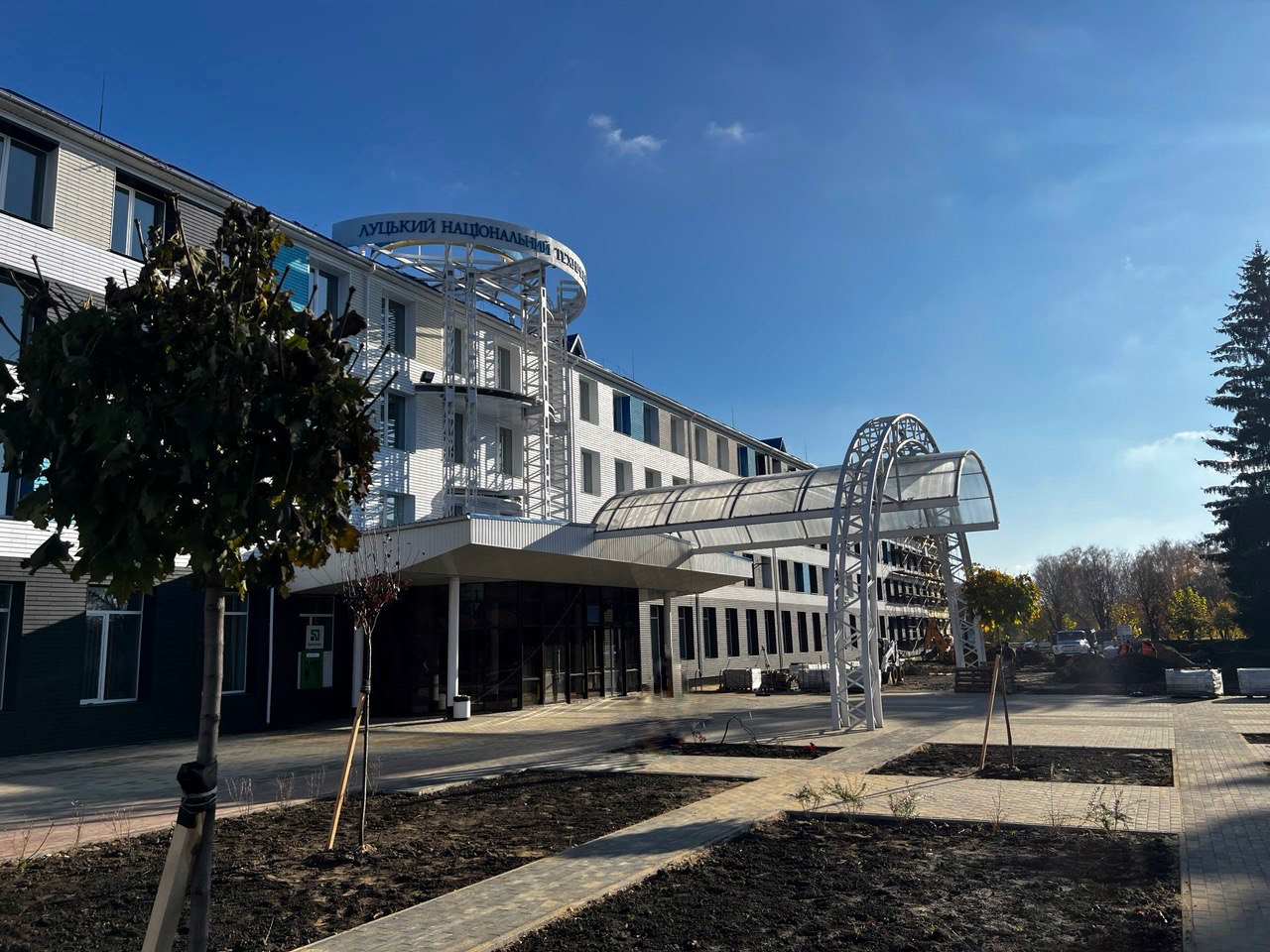
- Motto: Docendo Discimus
- Established: 1966
- Affiliations: Ministry of Education and Science of Ukraine
- Rector: Iryna Vakhovych
- Location: Lutsk, Ukraine
- Website: Official website lntu.edu.ua

University rankings

Regional – Overall
- QS Emerging Europe and Central Asia: 251-300 (2022)

The Lutsk National Technical University is a Ukrainian state-sponsored university in Lutsk at the IV accreditation level.

== History ==
Lutsk NTU was founded in 1966 by Nikolai Romanyuk, a former director of the Lutsk Automobile Plant, and Yevgen Petrovich Verizhenko, the rector of Kadi. The opening of the university followed the opening of the Department of General Technical Faculty of the Kiev Automobile and Road Institute. 105 students were enrolled in the school's first class.

The head was D.K. Konovalyuk. On November 1, 1968, the department was transformed into Lutsk General Technical Faculty, which in turn became the Lviv General Institute in July 1971. The department trained students in machine development and construction and over time, was reorganized into a Lutsk branch of the Lviv Polytechnic Institute.

The new branch included six departments that worked to train engineers and technical personnel in 12 specialties. The first director was I.M. Khorolsky.

In 1976, the university began to offer graduate training on a full-time and correspondence basis for engineers in the following areas:

- The Technology of Mechanical Engineering;
- Metal Cutting Machines and Tools;
- Industrial and Civil Engineering.

In 1978, the university opened the Department of Mechanical Engineering. With this expansion came growth in the teaching and research staff, new training and laboratory buildings, a dormitory, a canteen, and a sports and recreation facility.

On July 16, 1990, the Verkhovna Rada (Parliament) of Ukraine adopted the Declaration on State Sovereignty of Ukraine and on August 24, 1991, Ukraine proclaimed itself an independent, democratic state. This change led to radical transformations in education, one of which was in the training of technical specialists like engineers. These changes resulted in the formation of the Lutsk Industrial Institute on April 1, 1991, from what was formerly the Lutsk branch of the Lviv Polytechnic Institute.

The Lutsk Industrial Institute comprised 21 departments dedicated to providing students with technical education. In 1991, the Institute began offering a postgraduate program.

Since 1995, the institute offers degrees at the Bachelor, Specialist and Master levels in technology and economics.

In 1997, the Lutsk Technical Institute received the fourth highest accreditation level in Ukraine - university status - and was into renamed Lutsk State Technical University. In 2008 Lutsk State Technical University got the status on national and was renamed into Lutsk National Technical University

== Structure ==
As of 2018, the university operates 7 faculties, 3 centres, 3 colleges and 30 departments.

As of 2014, the university had nearly 12,000 enrolled students and 410 members of academic staff, including 32 professors, 298 assistant professors and 16 academics who helped with other classes.

== Facilities ==
The school occupies an area of 60,990 square meters. As of 2014, the university had 6 buildings, 2 dormitories, and a sports complex.

Lutsk NTU has two sporting health improvement tourist inns on the lakes Svityaz' and Pisochne, as well as a sports complex with a gym, two fitness centers, a room for aerobics, a 25m pool and a stadium.

== Collaborations ==
Lutsk NTU collaborates with other schools in Ukraine, as well as schools in Poland, Great Britain, and Germany.

The Faculty of Business has parallel training agreements with the Poznan Academy of Hotel Economy, Wroclaw Economic University, the University of Logistics and Customs, the University of Barcelona and the High School of International Relations and Social Communication in Chelm.

The Ecology, Instruments and Power Systems departments collaborate with the Institute of Semiconductor Physics of NAS of Ukraine, the Institute of Nuclear Research of NAS Ukraine, Taras Shevchenko Kyiv National University, Ivan Franko Lviv National University, Yuriy Fedkovych Chernivtsi National University, Mykhailo Lomonosov Moscow State University, Leningrad State Hydro meteorological Institute, Zheshiv Politechnic (Poland), the Higher Technical School Lippe (Germany), and others.

Lutsk NTU also offers co-operative education programs with Ukrainian Packaging Club and Ukrainian Materials Science.

== Notable alumni ==
- Mykola Romaniuk– Mayor of Lutsk
- Oleksandr Polozhynskiy – Frontman of the group "Tartak"
- Olena Abaza – TV host of the 5th channel
- Taras Mykhalyk – Ukrainian football player, player of Dynamo national team of Ukraine
- Natalia Pokinska – Director of Kronospan UA Ltd.
- Oleksandr Polozhynskyi – Ukrainian singer and presenter
- Yaroslav Fedorchenko – Commercial Director of Kaskad-Production Ltd.
- Leontiy Ivanishyn – General Director of Reinforced Concrete Constructions Plant Ltd.
- Iryna Zhychuk – Modern painter-designer, winner of Ukrainian Art Week, founder of the public organization Kvartyra FM

Lutsk NTU was featured 7th on the list of the Best Technical Universities in Ukraine in the 26th edition of the Edition in Ukraine newspaper, out of a total of 26 institutions.

== Sources ==
- Official website of Lutsk National Technical University
- Website of Lutsk National Technical University
- Website of public organization "Kvartyra FM"
