= Zhovkva Raion =

Former subdivision of Lviv Oblast, Ukraine

Zhovkva Raion Жовківський район
- Raion
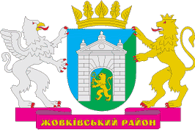
- Flag Coat of arms

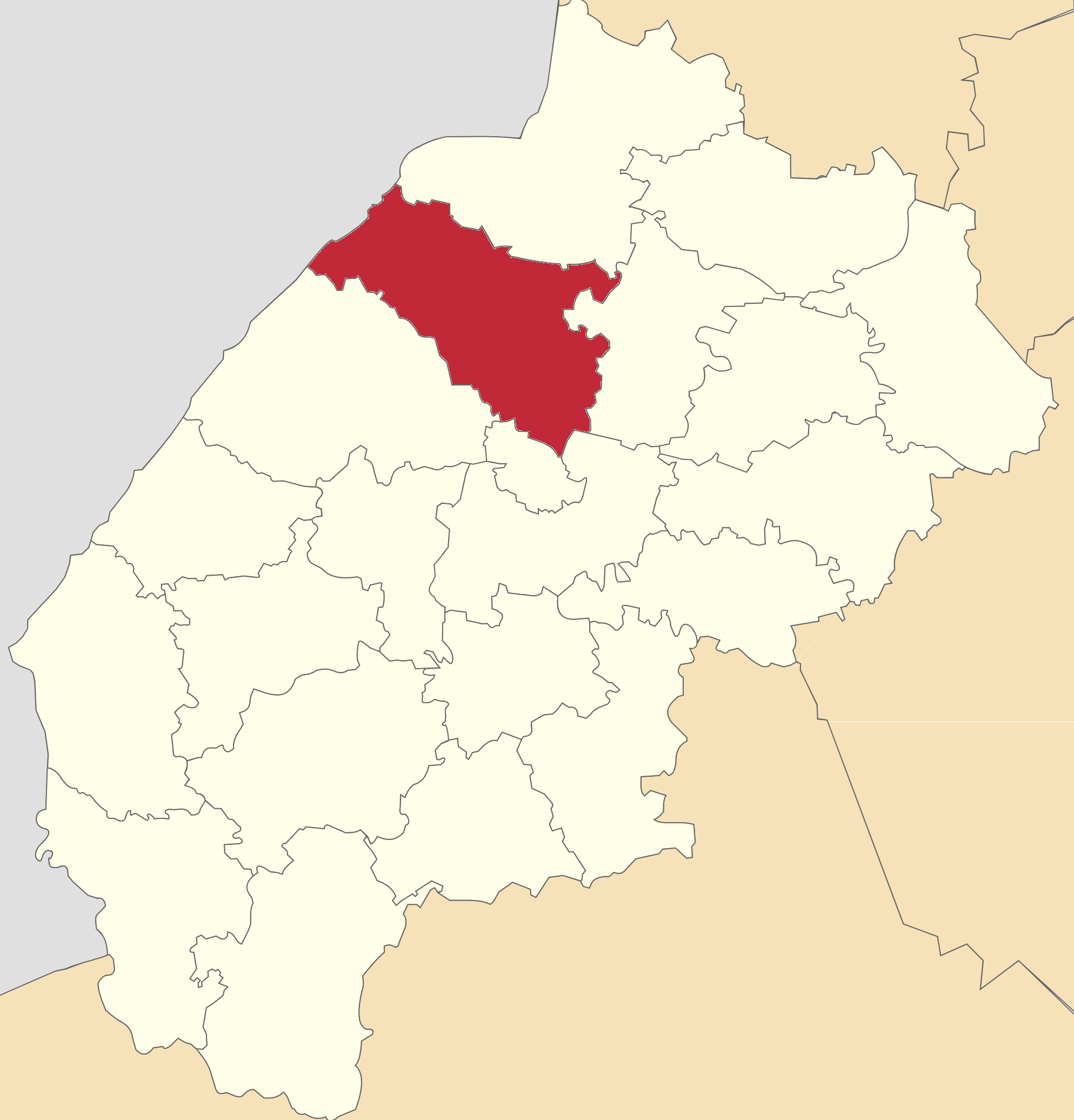
- Coordinates: 50°6′52″N 23°53′37″E
- Country: Ukraine
- Region: Lviv Oblast
- Established: 1940
- Disestablished: 18 July 2020
- Admin. center: Zhovkva
- Subdivisions: List: — city councils; — settlement councils; — rural councils; Number of localities: — cities; — urban-type settlements; 160 — villages; — rural settlements

Area
  - Total: 1,295 km^{2} (500 sq mi)

Population (2020)
  - Total: 110,223
  - Density: 85.11/km^{2} (220.4/sq mi)
- Time zone: UTC+02:00 (EET)
  - Summer (DST): UTC+03:00 (EEST)
- Postal index: 80300—80383
- Area code: 380-3252
- Website: http://zhovkva.org.ua/ Zhovkva Raion

Zhovkva Raion (Ukrainian: Жовківський район) was a raion (district) in Lviv Oblast in western Ukraine. Its administrative center was the city of Zhovkva. The raion was abolished on 18 July 2020 as part of the administrative reform of Ukraine, which reduced the number of raions of Lviv Oblast to seven. The area of Zhovkva Raion was merged into Lviv Raion. The last estimate of the raion's population was 110,223 (2020 est.).

It was established in 1940.

At the time of disestablishment, the raion consisted of four hromadas:

- Dobrosyn-Maheriv settlement hromada with the administration in the urban-type settlement of Maheriv;
- Kulykiv settlement hromada with the administration in the urban-type settlement of Kulykiv;
- Rava-Ruska urban hromada with the administration in the city of Rava-Ruska;
- Zhovkva urban hromada with the administration in Zhovkva.

== Villages ==
- Zashkiv, Zhovkva Raion
- Liubelia

== People ==
- Yevhen Konovalets — a military commander of the Ukrainian People's Republic army and the leader of the Organization of Ukrainian Nationalists between 1929 and 1938
- Volodymyr Parasyuk — Ukrainian soldier, politician, activist, and People's Deputy of Ukraine

== See also ==
- Administrative divisions of Lviv Oblast
