= Administrative divisions of Chernihiv Oblast =

Chernihiv Oblast is subdivided into districts (raions) which are further subdivided into territorial communities (hromadas).

== Current ==
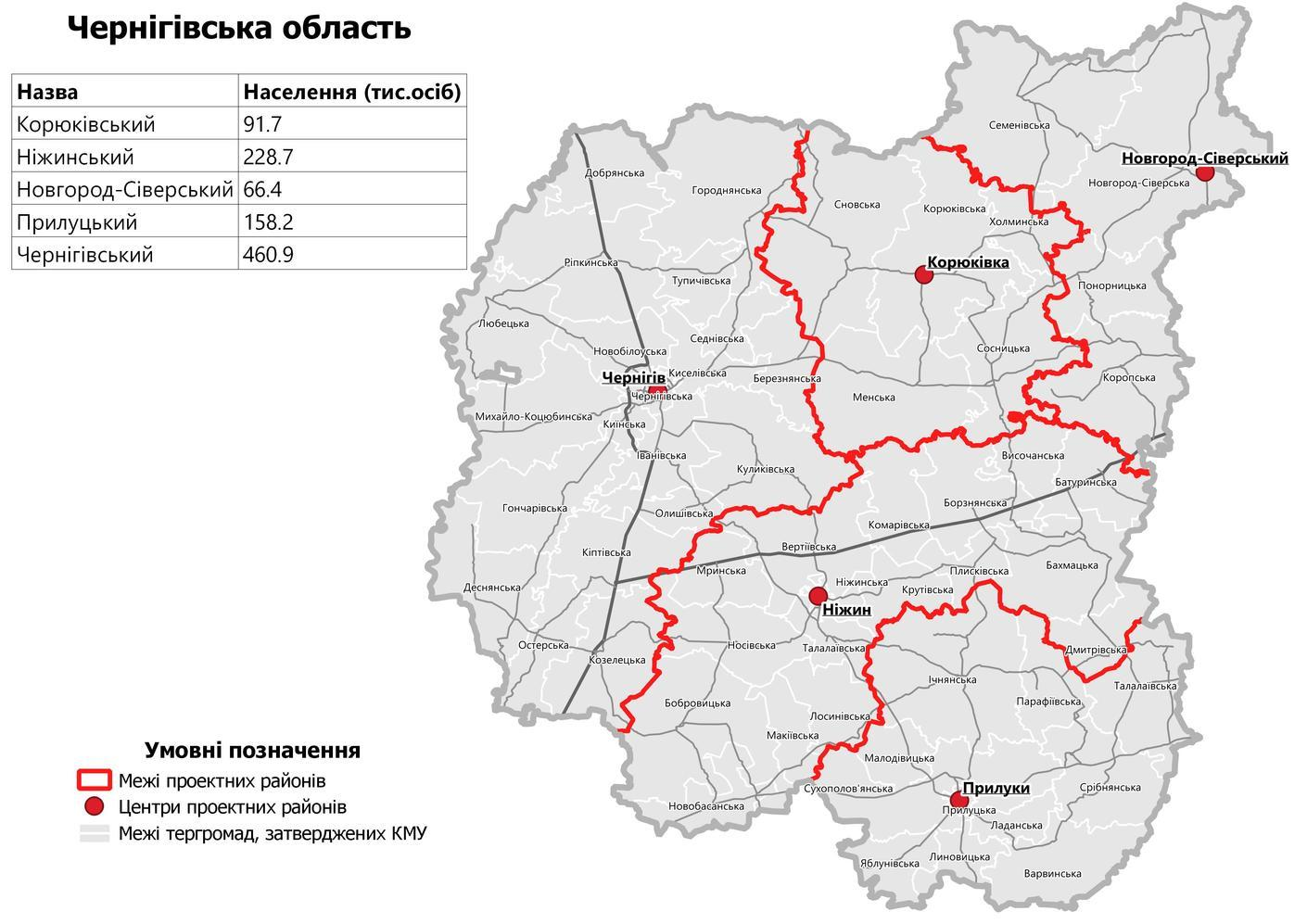
Raions of Chernihiv Oblast as of August 2020.

On 18 July 2020, the number of districts was reduced to five. These are:

1. Chernihiv (Чернігівський район), the center is in the city of Chernihiv;
2. Koriukivka (Корюківський район), the center is in the city of Koriukivka;
3. Nizhyn (Ніжинський район), the center is in the city of Nizhyn;
4. Novhorod-Siverskyi (Новгород-Сіверський район), the center is in the city of Novhorod-Siverskyi;
5. Pryluky (Прилуцький район), the center is in the city of Pryluky.

**Chernihiv Oblast**
As of January 1, 2022
Number of districts (райони)	5
Number of hromadas (громади)	57

=== Communities (hromadas) per District (raion) ===
In bold are communities (hromadas) with cities

Chernihiv Raion

- Berezna
- **Chernihiv**
- Desna
- Dobrianka
- Honcharivske
- **Horodnia**
- Ivanivka
- Kipti
- Kozelets
- Kulykivka
- Kyinka
- Kyselivka
- Liubech
- Mykhailo-Kotsiubynske
- Novyi Bilous
- Olyshivka
- **Oster**
- Ripky
- Sedniv
- Tupychiv

Koriukivka Raion

- Kholmy
- **Koriukivka**
- **Mena**
- **Snovsk**
- Sosnytsia

Nizhyn Raion

- **Bakhmach**
- **Baturyn**
- **Bobrovytsia**
- **Borzna**
- Dmytrivka
- Komarivka
- Kruty
- Losynivka
- Makiivka
- Mryn
- **Nizhyn**
- **Nosivka**
- Nova Basan
- Plysky
- Talalayivka
- Vertiivka
- Vysoke

Novhorod-Siverskyi Raion

- Korop
- **Novhorod-Siverskyi**
- Ponornytsia
- **Semenivka**

Pryluky Raion

- **Ichnia**
- Ladan
- Lynovytsia
- Mala Divytsia
- Parafiivka
- **Pryluky**
- Sribne
- Sukhopolova
- Talalayivka
- Varva
- Yablunivka

== Administrative divisions until 2020 ==
=== Original composition ===
Chernihiv Oblast was created in 1932 and was subdivided into 36 districts (raions). In 1932, the original Chernihiv Oblast besides its 1991 territory covered territories of the northern half of Sumy Oblast as well. Upon its formation, Chernihiv Oblast encompassed districts (raions) transferred from Kyiv Oblast (29 districts) and Kharkiv Oblast (7 districts).

- Districts (raions, A–N):
  - Bakhmach Raion (Бахмацький район, Київської області)
  - Berezna Raion (Березнянський район, Київської області)
  - Bobrovytsia Raion (Бобровицький район, Київської області)
  - Borzna Raion (Борознянський район, Київської області)
  - Buryn Raion (Буринський район, Харківської області)
  - Chernihiv Raion (Чернігівський район, Київської області)
  - Dmytrivka Raion (Дмитріївський район, Київської області)
  - Dobrianka Raion (Добрянський район, Київської області)
  - Hlukhiv Raion (Глухівський район, Київської області)
  - Horodnia Raion (Городнянський район, Київської області)
  - Ichnia Raion (Ічнянський район, Київської області)
  - Ivanytsia Raion (Іваницький район, Київської області)
  - Konotop Raion (Конотопський район, Київської області)
  - Koriukivka Raion (Корюківський район, Київської області)
  - Korop Raion (Коропський район, Київської області)
  - Kozelets Raion (Козелецький район, Київської області)
  - Krolevets Raion (Кролевецький район, Київської області)
  - Mala Divytsia Raion (Малодівицький район, Київської області)
  - Mena Raion (Менський район, Київської області)
- Districts passed on to Chernihiv Oblast (raions, N–S):
  - Nedryhailiv Raion (Недригайдівський район, Харківської області)
  - Nizhyn Raion (Ніжинський район, Київської області)
  - Nosivka Raion (Носівський район, Київської області)
  - Novhorod-Siverskyi Raion (Новгород-Сіверський район, Київської області)
  - Olyshivka Raion (Олишівський район, Київської області)
  - Oster Raion (Остерський район, Київської області)
  - Ponornytsia Raion (Понорницький район, Київської області)
  - Pryluky Raion (Прилуцький район, Харківської області)
  - Putyvl Raion, ethnic Russian (Путивельський район (нац. рос.), Харківської області)
  - Ripky Raion (Ріпківський район, Київської області)
  - Romny Raion (Роменський район, Харківської області)
  - Semenivka Raion (Семенівський район, Київської області)
  - Seredyna-Buda Raion (Середино-Будський район, Київської області)
  - Shostka Raion (Шосткинський район, Київської області)
  - Snovsk Raion (Сновський район, Київської області)
  - Varva Raion (Варвинський район, Харківської області)
  - Velyki Bubny Raion (Велико-Бубнівський район, Харківської області)

=== Later composition ===
Raions of Chernihiv Oblast as of June 2020. The city of Chernihiv is shown in dark blue.

Before 2020, Chernihiv Oblast was subdivided into 26 regions: 22 districts (raions) and 4 city municipalities (mis'krada or misto), officially known as territories governed by city councils.

- Cities under the oblast's jurisdiction:
  - Chernihiv (Чернігів), the administrative center of the oblast
  - Nizhyn (Ніжин)
  - Novhorod-Siverskyi Municipality
    - Cities under the city's jurisdiction:
      - Novhorod-Siverskyi (Новгород-Сіверський)
  - Pryluky (Прилуки)
- Districts (raions):
  - Bakhmach (Бахмацький район)
    - Cities under the district's jurisdiction:
      - Bakhmach (Бахмач)
      - Baturyn (Батурин)
    - Urban-type settlements under the district's jurisdiction:
      - Dmytrivka (Дмитрівка)
  - Bobrovytsia (Бобровицький район)
    - Cities under the district's jurisdiction:
      - Bobrovytsia (Бобровиця)
  - Borzna (Борзнянський район)
    - Cities under the district's jurisdiction:
      - Borzna (Борзна)
  - Chernihiv (Чернігівський район)
    - Urban-type settlements under the district's jurisdiction:
      - Honcharivske (Гончарівське)
      - Mykhailo-Kotsiubynske (Михайло-Коцюбинське)
      - Olyshivka (Олишівка)
      - Sedniv (Седнів)
  - Horodnia (Городнянський район)
    - Cities under the district's jurisdiction:
      - Horodnia (Городня)
  - Ichnia (Ічнянський район)
    - Cities under the district's jurisdiction:
      - Ichnia (Ічня)
    - Urban-type settlements under the district's jurisdiction:
      - Druzhba (Дружба)
      - Parafiivka (Парафіївка)
  - Koriukivka (Корюківський район)
    - Cities under the district's jurisdiction:
      - Koriukivka (Корюківка)
    - Urban-type settlements under the district's jurisdiction:
      - Kholmy (Холми)
  - Korop (Коропський район)
    - Urban-type settlements under the district's jurisdiction:
      - Korop (Короп)
      - Ponornytsia (Понорниця)
  - Kozelets (Козелецький район)
    - Cities under the district's jurisdiction:
      - Oster (Остер)
    - Urban-type settlements under the district's jurisdiction:
      - Desna (Десна)
      - Kozelets (Козелець)
  - Kulykivka (Куликівський район)
    - Urban-type settlements under the district's jurisdiction:
      - Kulykivka (Куликівка)
  - Mena (Менський район)
    - Cities under the district's jurisdiction:
      - Mena (Мена)
    - Urban-type settlements under the district's jurisdiction:
      - Berezna (Березна)
      - Makoshyne (Макошине)
  - Nizhyn (Ніжинський район)
    - Urban-type settlements under the district's jurisdiction:
      - Losynivka (Лосинівка)
  - Nosivka (Носівський район)
    - Cities under the district's jurisdiction:
      - Nosivka (Носівка)
  - Novhorod-Siverskyi (Новгород-Сіверський район)
  - Pryluky (Прилуцький район)
    - Urban-type settlements under the district's jurisdiction:
      - Ladan (Ладан)
      - Lynovytsia (Линовиця)
      - Mala Divytsia (Мала Дівиця)
  - Ripky (Ріпкинський район)
    - Urban-type settlements under the district's jurisdiction:
      - Dobrianka (Добрянка)
      - Liubech (Любеч)
      - Radul (Радуль)
      - Ripky (Ріпки)
      - Zamhlai (Замглай)
  - Semenivka (Семенівський район)
    - Cities under the district's jurisdiction:
      - Semenivka (Семенівка)
  - Snovsk (Сновський район), formerly Shchors Raion
    - Cities under the district's jurisdiction:
      - Snovsk (Сновськ), formerly Shchors
  - Sosnytsia (Сосницький район)
    - Urban-type settlements under the district's jurisdiction:
      - Sosnytsia (Сосниця)
  - Sribne (Срібнянський район)
    - Urban-type settlements under the district's jurisdiction:
      - Dihtiari (Дігтярі)
      - Sribne (Срібне)
  - Talalaivka (Талалаївський район)
    - Urban-type settlements under the district's jurisdiction:
      - Talalaivka (Талалаївка)
  - Varva (Варвинський район)
    - Urban-type settlements under the district's jurisdiction:
      - Varva (Варва)
