= Russian occupation of Chernihiv Oblast =

Military occupation by Russia

- Part of the Russian invasion of Ukraine
Date	24 February 2022 – 6 April 2022 (1 month, 1 week and 6 days)
Location	Chernihiv Oblast, Ukraine

On 24 February 2022, the Russian military invaded Ukraine, crossing the Russia-Ukraine and Belarus–Ukraine borders at several points in Chernihiv Oblast. Russian troops unsuccessfully attempted to capture the capital city of the oblast, Chernihiv, as part of a strategy to reach the Ukraine's capital Kyiv from the east.

== Occupation ==
During the occupation, 478 people died, including 334 men, 122 women, and 22 children. Most died because of artillery and air attacks.

=== Horodnia ===
Horodnia was occupied on 24 February 2022, the first day of the invasion.

Russian forces left Horodnia on 1 April, blowing up a bridge as they withdrew. According to Ukrainian officials, the situation in the town was "under control" by the next day.

=== Russian withdrawal ===
On 29 March, Russian officials announced withdrawal of their forces from the region. The General Staff of Ukraine confirmed that they started to withdraw on the same day. By 31 March, the Chernihiv Oblast governor Vyacheslav Chaus said that Russian forces had begun withdrawing from the region.

On 5 April, Ukrainian military took control of some segments of the border in the Chernihiv region while Russian forced continued to withdraw. The Pentagon confirmed their full departure the next day.

== Aftermath ==
After Russian forces withdrew, Ukrainian forces began demining operations in Chernihiv Oblast .

Russian forces still shell small towns and villages near the border with Russia.

On 15 November 2024, a likely Russian reconnaissance and sabotage unit conducted a cross-border incursion into the Chernihiv Oblast. According to Russian military bloggers, the Russian force entered and/or seized the villages of Hremiach, Kolos, Novoselivka and Murav'yi, though the Institute for the Study of War was unable to confirm that the Russian forces were maintaining positions in the area; Ukrainian officials claimed that Russian forces only briefly crossed into the region as part of an "information operation."

== Control of cities ==
Name	Pop.	Raion	Held by	As of	More information
Bakhmach	17,192	Nizhyn	Ukraine	4 Apr 2022	
Baturyn	2,458	Nizhyn	Ukraine	1 Jan 2024	
Bobrovytsia	10,742	Nizhyn	Ukraine	4 Apr 2022	
Borzna	9,632	Nizhyn	Ukraine	4 Apr 2022	
Chernihiv (Note: Hero City of Ukraine)	285,234	Chernihiv	Ukraine	25 Mar 2022	See Siege of Chernihiv, Chernihiv bombing, Chernihiv breadline attack
Horodnia	11,710	Chernihiv	Ukraine	2 Apr 2022	Captured by Russia on 24 February 2022. Recaptured by Ukraine on 2 April 2022.
Ichnia	10,585	Pryluky	Ukraine	1 Jan 2024	
Koriukivka	12,409	Koriukivka	Ukraine	4 Apr 2022	Captured by Russia on 25 February 2022. Recaptured by Ukraine on 4 April 2022.
Kozelets	7,646	Chernihiv	Ukraine	29 Mar 2022	Captured by Russia on 3 March 2022. Recaptured by Ukraine on 31 March 2022.
Mena	11,096	Koriukivka	Ukraine	4 Apr 2022	
Mykhailo-Kotsiubynske	2,851	Chernihiv	Ukraine	2 Apr 2022	Captured by Russia on 28 February 2022. Recaptured by Ukraine on 2 April 2022.
Nizhyn	66,983	Nizhyn	Ukraine	1 Jan 2024	
Nosivka	13,120	Nizhyn	Ukraine	1 Jan 2024	
Nova Basan	2,929	Nizhyn	Ukraine	31 Mar 2022	Captured by Russia on 28 February 2022. Recaptured by Ukraine on 31 March 2022.
Novhorod-Siverskyi	12,647	Novhorod-Siverskyi	Ukraine	11 Mar 2022	
Novyi Bykiv	2,024	Nizhyn	Ukraine	2 Apr 2022	Captured by Russia on 25 February 2022. Recaptured by Ukraine on 31 March 2022.
Oster	5,655	Chernihiv	Ukraine	1 Jan 2024	
Pryluky	52,553	Pryluky	Ukraine	1 Jan 2024	
Ripky	6,807	Chernihiv	Ukraine	4 Apr 2022	Captured by Russia on 24 February 2022. Recaptured by Ukraine on 2 April 2022.
Sedniv	1,063	Chernihiv	Ukraine	4 Apr 2022	
Semenivka	7,952	Novhorod-Siverskyi	Ukraine	4 Apr 2022	Captured by Russia on 24 February 2022. Recaptured by Ukraine on 4 April 2022.
Snovsk	10,825	Koriukivka	Ukraine	4 Apr 2022	
Sosnytsia	6,708	Koriukivka	Ukraine	4 Apr 2022	

== See also ==
- Russian invasion of Ukraine
- Russo-Ukrainian War
- Outline of the Russo-Ukrainian war
- Russian-occupied territories of Ukraine (former occupation marked in italics)
  - Russian occupation of Crimea
  - Russian occupation of Donetsk Oblast
  - Russian occupation of Dnipropetrovsk Oblast
  - Russian occupation of Kharkiv Oblast
  - Russian occupation of Kherson Oblast
  - Russian occupation of Kyiv Oblast
  - Russian occupation of Luhansk Oblast
  - Russian occupation of Mykolaiv Oblast
  - Russian occupation of Sumy Oblast
  - Russian occupation of Zaporizhzhia Oblast
  - Russian occupation of Zhytomyr Oblast
  - Snake Island campaign
- Annexation of Crimea by the Russian Federation
- Russian annexation of Donetsk, Kherson, Luhansk and Zaporizhzhia oblasts
- 2022 protests in Russian-occupied Ukraine
- Ukrainian resistance during the Russian invasion of Ukraine
- War crimes in the Russian invasion of Ukraine
- Russian war crimes
- War crime
