= Zamhlai =

Rural locality in Chernihiv Oblast, Ukraine

Zamhlai Замглай
- Rural settlement
- Location within Chernihiv Oblast Location within Ukraine
- Coordinates: 51°48′54″N 31°09′33″E
- Country: Ukraine
- Oblast: Chernihiv Oblast
- Raion: Chernihiv Raion

Population (2022)
  - Total: 1,723
- Time zone: UTC+2 (EET)
  - Summer (DST): UTC+3 (EEST)

Zamhlai (Ukrainian: Замглай; Russian: Замглай) is a rural settlement in Chernihiv Raion, Chernihiv Oblast, northern Ukraine. It belongs to Ripky settlement hromada, one of the hromadas of Ukraine. Population: 1,723 (2022 estimate).

== History ==
Until 18 July 2020, Zamhlai belonged to Ripky Raion. The raion was abolished in July 2020 as part of the administrative reform of Ukraine, which reduced the number of raions of Chernihiv Oblast to five. The area of Ripky Raion was merged into Chernihiv Raion.

Until 26 January 2024, Zamhlai was designated urban-type settlement. On this day, a new law entered into force which abolished this status, and Zamhlai became a rural settlement.

== Economy ==
=== Transportation ===
The closest railway station, Hlynianka, on the railway line connecting Chernihiv and Hornostaivka is located 3 kilometres (1.9 mi) west of the settlement. There is infrequent suburban passenger traffic.

Zamhlai is connected to Ripky by a paved road. In Ripky, there is access to Highway M01 which connects Kyiv with the border with Belarus and continues across the border to Gomel.
