= Stroivka, Chernihiv Oblast =

Stroivka Строївка
- Village
- Location within Chernihiv Oblast Location within Ukraine
- Coordinates: 51°59′45″N 31°08′22″E
- Country: Ukraine
- Oblast: Chernihiv Oblast
- Raion: Chernihiv Raion

Population (2001)
  - Total: 55
- Postal code: 15010

Stroivka (Ukrainian: Строївка) is a village in Chernihiv Raion, Chernihiv Oblast, Ukraine. It belongs to Dobrianka settlement hromada, one of the hromadas of Ukraine.

Until 18 July 2020, Stroivka belonged to Ripky Raion. The raion was abolished in July 2020 as part of the administrative reform of Ukraine, which reduced the number of raions of Chernihiv Oblast to five. The area of Ripky Raion was merged into Chernihiv Raion.
