= Radul, Ukraine =

Rural locality in Chernihiv Oblast, Ukraine

Radul Радуль
- Rural settlement
- Location within Chernihiv Oblast Location within Ukraine
- Coordinates: 51°49′52″N 30°42′54″E
- Country: Ukraine
- Oblast: Chernihiv Oblast
- Raion: Chernihiv Raion
- Hromada: Ripky settlement hromada

Population (2022)
  - Total: 444
- Time zone: UTC+2 (EET)
  - Summer (DST): UTC+3 (EEST)

Radul (Ukrainian: Радуль) is a rural settlement in Chernihiv Raion, Chernihiv Oblast, northern Ukraine. It is located on the left bank of the Dnieper, which here also makes the border between Ukraine and Belarus. It belongs to Ripky settlement hromada, one of the hromadas of Ukraine. Population: 444 (2022 estimate).

== History ==
Until 18 July 2020, Radul belonged to Ripky Raion. The raion was abolished in July 2020 as part of the administrative reform of Ukraine, which reduced the number of raions of Chernihiv Oblast to five. The area of Ripky Raion was merged into Chernihiv Raion.

Until 26 January 2024, Radul was designated urban-type settlement. On this day, a new law entered into force which abolished this status, and Radul became a rural settlement.

== Economy ==
=== Transportation ===
The closest railway stations (Hlynianka and Holubychi) are located in Ripky. There is infrequent suburban passenger traffic.

Radul is connected to Ripky by a paved road. In Ripky, there is access to Highway M01 which connects Kyiv with the border with Belarus and continues across the border to Gomel.
