= Kozelets Raion =

Former subdivision of Chernihiv Oblast, Ukraine

Kozelets Raion Козелецький район
- Raion
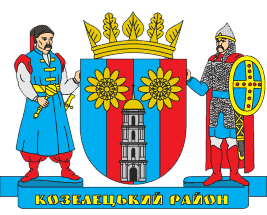
- Flag Coat of arms

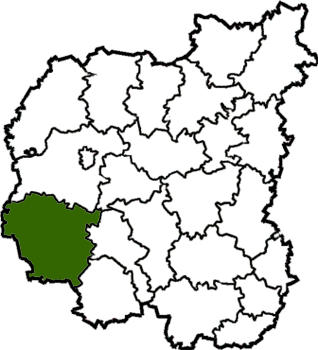
- Coordinates: 50°54′0″N 31°07′0″E
- Country: Ukraine
- Region: Chernihiv Oblast
- Established: 7 March 1923
- Disestablished: 18 July 2020
- Admin. center: Kozelets
- Subdivisions: List: 1 — city councils; 2 — settlement councils; 40 — rural councils; Number of localities: 1 — cities; 2 — urban-type settlements; 106 — villages; 2 — rural settlements

Government
  - Governor: Sergey Andreev
  - Chairman: Volodymyr Ponomarenko

Area
  - Total: 2,660 km^{2} (1,030 sq mi)

Population (2020)
  - Total: 42,282 ▼
  - Density: 15.9/km^{2} (41.2/sq mi)
- Time zone: UTC+02:00 (EET)
  - Summer (DST): UTC+03:00 (EEST)
- Postal index: 17000—17085
- Area code: +380 4646
- Website: http://kozadm.cg.gov.ua

Kozelets Raion (Ukrainian: Козелецький район, Kozelets'kyi raion) was one of the 22 administrative raions (a district) of Chernihiv Oblast in northern Ukraine. Its administrative center was located at the urban-type settlement of Kozelets. Its population was 61,636 in the 2001 Ukrainian Census. The raion was abolished on 18 July 2020 as part of the administrative reform of Ukraine, which reduced the number of raions of Chernihiv Oblast to five. The area of Kozelets Raion was merged into Chernihiv Raion. The last estimate of the raion population was 42,282 (2020 est.)

== Geography ==
Kozelets Raion was located in the southwestern part of the Chernihiv Oblast, corresponding to the modern-day boundaries of the Polissia historical regions. To its west and south, it bordered upon Vyshhorod and Brovary Raions of Kyiv Oblast. Its total area constituted 2,660 square kilometres (1,030 mi^{2}), constituting 8.3 percent of the total area of Chernihiv Oblast.

== History ==
As part of a full-scale administrative reorganization of the Ukrainian Soviet Socialist Republic, the Oster Raion was created on March 7, 1923, as an administrative entity of the Nizhyn Okruha; later in July of that year, the Kozelets Raion was also created. During the Holodomor, 508 people died throughout 36 settlements in the Kozelets Raion.

== Administrative divisions ==
At the time of disestablishment, the raion consisted of four hromadas:

- Desna settlement hromada with the administration in the urban-type settlement of Desna;
- Kipti rural hromada with the administration in the selo of Kipti;
- Kozelets settlement hromada with the administration in Kozelets;
- Oster urban hromada with the administration in the city of Oster.

Kozelets Raion was divided in a way that followed the general administrative scheme in Ukraine. Local government was also organized along a similar scheme nationwide. Consequently, raions were subdivided into councils, which were the prime level of administrative division in the country.

Each of the raion's urban localities administered their own councils, often containing a few other villages within its jurisdiction. However, only a handful of rural localities were organized into councils, which also might contain a few villages within its jurisdiction.

Accordingly, the Kozelets Raion was divided into:

- 1 city council—made up of the city of Oster
- 2 settlement councils—made up of the urban-type settlements of Desna and Kozelets (administrative center)
- 40 village councils

Overall, the raion had a total of 111 populated localities, consisting of one city, two urban-type settlements, 106 villages, and 2 rural settlements.

== Places of interest ==
- Mizhrichynskyi Regional Landscape Park
- Cathedral of the Nativity in Kozelets
