= Kozelets settlement hromada =

Kozelets settlement hromada Козелецька селищна громада
- Hromada
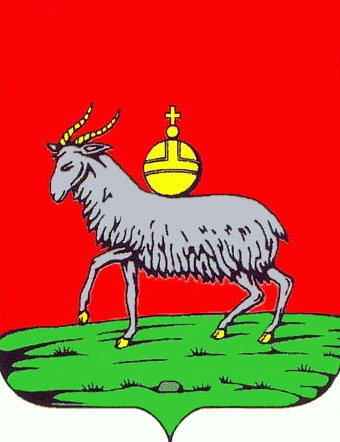
- Coat of arms
- Interactive map of Kozelets settlement hromada
- Country: Ukraine
- Oblast: Chernihiv
- Raion: Chernihiv

Area
  - Total: 697.0 km^{2} (269.1 sq mi)

Population (2020)
  - Total: 16,148
  - Density: 23.17/km^{2} (60.00/sq mi)
- CATOTTG code: UA74100190000086457
- Settlements: 54
- Rural settlements: 1
- Villages: 52
- Towns: 1
- Website: kozsr.gov.ua

Kozelets settlement hromada (Ukrainian: Козелецька селищна громада) is a hromada of Ukraine, located in Chernihiv Raion, Chernihiv Oblast. Its administrative center is the town of Kozelets. The territory of the hromada is located within the Dnieper Lowland,on the Oster River. The main industries of the community are agriculture, food industry and wood processing.

It has an area of 697.0 square kilometres (269.1 mi^{2}) and a population of 16,148, as of 2020.

== Composition ==
The hromada includes 54 settlements: 1 town (Kozelets), 52 villages:

- Berlozy
- Bileiky
- Bludshe
- Bobruiky
- Boiarivka
- Bryhyntsi
- Budyshche
- Bulakhov
- Harbuzyn
- Hladke
- Hlamazdy
- Horbachi
- Danivka
- Yerkiv
- Zherebetske
- Zakrevske
- Karasynivka
- Karpoky
- Korniiv
- Kryvytske
- Kurhanske
- Lemeshi
- Lykholitky
- Myrne
- Mostyshche
- Nichohivka
- Nova Hreblia
- Novyky
- Ozerne
- Oleksiivshchyna
- Omelianiv
- Openky
- Patiuty
- Pyliatyn
- Piznie
- Pisotske
- Pryvitne
- Pushkari
- Rykiv
- Savyn
- Syvukhy
- Syrai
- Skrypchyn
- Sokyryn
- Stavyske
- Tarasiv
- Topoli
- Chasnivtsi
- Shamy
- Shapihy
- Sholoiky
- Shuliaky

And 1 rural-type settlement: Kalytianske.

== Geography ==
The Kozelets settlement hromada is located on the Oster River in the southwestern part of Chernihiv Oblast. In the east, the Kozelets hromada borders the Oster urban hromada, in the west - with the Nosivska and Mryn hromadas (Nosivka Raion), in the north - the Kipti rural hromada, in the south - the Brovarskyi district of Kyiv Oblast.

The territory of the hromada is located within the Dnieper Lowland. The relief is flat. The soils are sod-podzolic, there is chernozem. There are also lakes, ponds and an artificial reservoir on the territory of the hromada. Minerals are peat, sand, clay.

The climate of Kozelets settlement hromada is moderately continental, with warm summers and relatively mild winters. The average temperature in January is about -7°C, and in July - +19°C. The average annual precipitation ranges from 550 to 660 mm, with the highest precipitation in the summer period.

The European transport route of international importance E95 passes through the hromada, which provides convenient communication with both Kyiv and Chernihiv. There is no railway, and the nearest railway station is 40 km away in Bobrovytsya.

11.1% of the community's area is covered by forests, 79.6% - agricultural land. The main industries of the community are agriculture, food industry and wood processing.

== See also ==
- List of hromadas of Ukraine
