= Ivanivka rural hromada, Chernihiv Oblast =

Ivanivka rural hromada Іванівська сільська громада
- Hromada
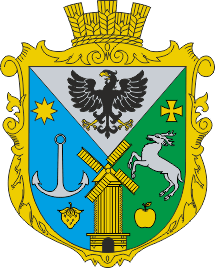
- Coat of arms
- Interactive map of Ivanivka rural hromada
- Country: Ukraine
- Oblast: Chernihiv
- Raion: Chernihiv

Area
  - Total: 418.0 km^{2} (161.4 sq mi)

Population (2020)
  - Total: 7,399
  - Density: 17.70/km^{2} (45.85/sq mi)
- CATOTTG code: UA74100110000030364
- Settlements: 17
- Villages: 17
- Website: iotg.gov.ua

Ivanivka rural hromada (Ukrainian: Іванівська сільська громада) is a hromada of Ukraine, located in Chernihiv Raion, Chernihiv Oblast. Its administrative center is the village of Ivanivka.

It has an area of 418.0 square kilometres (161.4 mi^{2}) and a population of 7,399, as of 2020.

Ivanivka is formally twinned with Meopham, a village in Kent, United Kingdom. The twinning agreement was signed in a virtual ceremony on 11 March 2025.

== Composition ==
The hromada contains 17 settlements, which are all villages:

- Anisiv
- Budy
- Viktorivka
- Drachivshchyna
- Drutske
- Yenkiv
- Zolotynka
- Ivanivka
- Kolychivka
- Krasne
- Ladynka
- Lukashivka
- Pidhirne
- Pisky
- Skorynets
- Sloboda
- Yahidne

== Geography ==
The territory of the hromada borders on the north with the Chernihiv urban territorial hromada, on the south with the Olyshiv settlement territorial hromada, on the east with the Kulykiv settlement territorial hromada. The Desna River (Dnieper basin) flows through the west of the hromada. The total area of the territory of the Ivanovka territorial hromada is 413.708 sq. km. The center of the Ivanovka territorial hromada is the village of Ivanivka, where 30% of the total population of the hromada lives.

The Ivanovka territorial hromada is located within the Dnieper Lowland. The relief of the surface of the district is a lowland plain, there are many oxbow lake in the floodplains of rivers.

The climate of Ivanovka territorial hromada is moderately continental, with warm summers and relatively mild winters. The average temperature in January is about -7°C, and in July - +19°C. The average annual precipitation ranges from 550 to 660 mm, with the highest precipitation in the summer period.

The most common are sod-podzolic and gray forest soils. The Ivanovka territorial hromada is located in the natural zone of mixed forests, in Polissya. The main species in the forests are pine, oak, alder, birch. Minerals – loam, peat. The community has developed forestry, vegetable and grain growing, and pig farming.

The European route E95 passes through the district. The railway from Chernihiv passes through the Ivanovka settlement hromada.

== See also ==
- List of hromadas of Ukraine
