= Honcharivske settlement hromada =

Honcharivske settlement hromada Гончарівська селищна громада
- Hromada
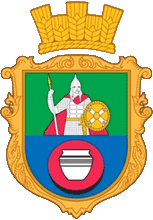
- Coat of arms
- Interactive map of Honcharivske settlement hromada
- Country: Ukraine
- Oblast: Chernihiv
- Raion: Chernihiv

Area
  - Total: 634.7 km^{2} (245.1 sq mi)

Population (2020)
  - Total: 6,190
  - Density: 9.75/km^{2} (25.3/sq mi)
- CATOTTG code: UA74100030000076377
- Settlements: 15
- Villages: 14
- Towns: 1
- Website: goncharivska.gromada.org.ua

Honcharivske settlement hromada (Ukrainian: Гончарівська селищна громада) is a hromada of Ukraine, located in Chernihiv Raion, Chernihiv Oblast. The territory of the hromada is located within the Dnieper Lowland, in the natural zone of mixed forests, in Polissya. Its administrative center is the town of Honcharivske.

It has an area of 634.7 square kilometres (245.1 mi^{2}) and a population of 6,190, as of 2020.

== Composition ==
The hromada includes 17 settlements: 1 town (Honcharivske) and 14 villages:

- Borovyky
- Budyshche
- Vasyleva Huta
- Vorokhovka
- Zheved
- Kozeroha
- Lebedivka
- Lisky
- Lisne
- Mazhuhivka
- Maksym
- Slabyn
- Smolin
- Sokolyvka
- Khatylova Huta
- Yakubivka

== Geography ==
The Honcharivskesettlement hromada is located in the southwest of Chernihiv Raion. The hromada is located between the Dnipro River (west) and the Desna River (east). Area – 634.7 km^{2}. The territory of the hromada is located within the Dnieper Lowland. The relief of the surface of the district is a lowland plain, there are many oxbow lake in the floodplains of rivers.

The climate of Honcharivske settlement hromada is moderately continental, with warm summers and relatively mild winters. The average temperature in January is about -7°C, and in July - +19°C. The average annual precipitation ranges from 550 to 660 mm, with the highest precipitation in the summer period.

The most common are sod-podzolic and meadow soils. The Honcharivske settlement hromada is located in the natural zone of mixed forests, in Polissya. The main species in the forests are pine, oak, alder, ash, birch. Minerals – loam, peat, sand. The Honcharivske settlement community specializes in forestry and growing grain crops.

On the territory of the Honcharivske territorial community there is the Mizhrichynskyi Regional Landscape Park, in which pine forests are protected.

== See also ==
- List of hromadas of Ukraine
