= Tupychiv rural hromada =

Tupychiv rural hromada Тупичівська сільська громада
- Hromada
- Interactive map of Tupychiv rural hromada
- Country: Ukraine
- Oblast: Chernihiv
- Raion: Chernihiv

Area
  - Total: 281.0 km^{2} (108.5 sq mi)

Population (2020)
  - Total: 4,021
  - Density: 14.31/km^{2} (37.06/sq mi)
- CATOTTG code: UA74100370000041962
- Settlements: 11
- Rural settlements: 1
- Villages: 10
- Website: tupychiv-rada.gov.ua

Tupychiv rural hromada (Ukrainian: Тупичівська сільська громада) is a hromada of Ukraine, located in Chernihiv Raion, Chernihiv Oblast. Its administrative center is the village of Tupychiv.

It has an area of 281.0 square kilometres (108.5 mi^{2}) and a population of 4,021, as of 2020.

It was formed on August 7, 2017 by merging the Burivska, Velykolystvenska, and Tupychivska village councils of the Horodnyansky district. On June 12, 2020, the Vykhvostivska, Ivashkivska, and Kulykivska village councils joined the community.

== Composition ==
The hromada contains 11 settlements, with 10 villages:

- Bezikyv
- Burivka
- Velikiy Listven
- Vykhvostiv
- Dovhe
- Ivashkivka
- Kulikivka
- Pershe Travnia
- Rozvynivka
- Tupychiv

And 1 rural-type settlement: Topolivka.

== Geography ==
The Tupychiv rural hromada is located in the northwest of Chernihiv Oblast, the borders the Horodnyanska, Sednivska, and Ripkynska territorial communities. The community is 53 km (30 km) from the borders with Belarus and 47 km from Russia. The territory of the hromada is located within the Dnieper Lowland. The relief of the surface of the district is a lowland, slightly undulating plain, sometimes dissected by river valleys. All rivers in the hromadas territory flow into the Dnieper basin. A tributary of the Snov (Desna basin) - the Kryukova River - flows through the rural hromada.

The climate of Tupychiv rural hromada is moderately continental, with warm summers and relatively mild winters. The average temperature in January is about -8°C, and in July - +19°C. The average annual precipitation ranges from 550 to 660 mm, with the highest precipitation in the summer period.

The most common are sod-podzolic and gray forest soils. The Tupychiv rural hromada is located in the natural zone of mixed forests, in Polissya. The main species in the forests are pine, oak, alder, ash, birch. Minerals – loam, peat, sand.

In the village of Velykyi Listven there is St. Michael's Church - an architectural monument of national importance, which was built in 1742.

The basis of the hromadas economy is agriculture and processing of agricultural products (flour production). The hromada has significant agricultural land resources, which facilitates the cultivation of grain crops, potatoes, fruits (apples) and vegetables.

No important highways pass through the territory of the Tupychiv rural hromada. There is no railway connection.

== See also ==
- List of hromadas of Ukraine
