= Novyi Bilous rural hromada =

Novyi Bilous rural hromada Новобілоуська сільська громада
- Hromada
- Interactive map of Novyi Bilous rural hromada
- Country: Ukraine
- Oblast: Chernihiv Oblast
- Raion: Chernihiv Raion

Area
  - Total: 377.5 km^{2} (145.8 sq mi)

Population (2020)
  - Total: 9,929
  - Density: 26.30/km^{2} (68.12/sq mi)
- CATOTTG code: UA74100270000049748
- Settlements: 22
- Villages: 22
- Website: novobilouska-gromada.gov.ua

Novyi Bilous rural hromada (Ukrainian: Новобілоуська сільська громада) is a hromada of Ukraine, located in Chernihiv Raion, Chernihiv Oblast. Its administrative center is the village of Novyi Bilous.

It has an area of 377.5 square kilometres (145.8 mi^{2}) and a population of 9,929, as of 2020.

On the 21st March 2025, Novyi Bilous entered into a twinning and friendship agreement with Higham, a parish in the County of Kent, United Kingdom.

== Composition ==
The hromada contains 22 settlements, which are all villages:

- Desnianka
- Dovzhyk
- Koshivka
- Kuvechychi
- Mokhnatyn
- Novyi Bilous
- Polubotky
- Radkivka
- Ryzhyky
- Rivnopillia
- Rohoshchi
- Roishche
- Rudka
- Riabtsi
- Selianska Sloboda
- Staryi Bilous
- Tabaivka
- Unuchky
- Khaliavyn
- Khmilnytsia
- Shevchenko
- Yurivka

== Geography ==
The Novyi Bilous rural hromada is located in the east of Chernihiv raion, in the southwest it borders the city of Chernihiv. The territory of the Novyi Bilous rural hromada is located within the Dnieper Lowland, belong to the Dnieper basin. The tributaries of the Desna River - Bilous and Stryzhen - flow through the territory of the hromada. The relief of the surface of the hromada is a lowland, slightly undulating plain, sometimes dissected by river valleys.

The climate of Novyi Bilous hromada is moderately continental, with warm summers and relatively mild winters. The average temperature ranges from -8°C in January to 20°C in July. The average annual precipitation ranges from 550 to 660 mm, with the highest precipitation in the summer period.

The most common are sod-podzolic soils. The Novyi Bilous hromada is located in the natural zone of mixed forests, in Polissya. The main species in the forests are pine, oak, alder. Minerals – loam, peat, sand.

In Novyi Bilous there is the Trinity Church, an architectural monument of national importance. This Orthodox church was built at the beginning of the 18th century.

== Economy ==
=== Transportation ===
The international highway E95 and the South-Western Railway pass through the territory of the Bereznyansk settlement community.

== See also ==
- List of hromadas of Ukraine
