= Horodnia Raion =

Former subdivision of Chernihiv Oblast, Ukraine

Horodnia Raion Городнянський район
- Raion
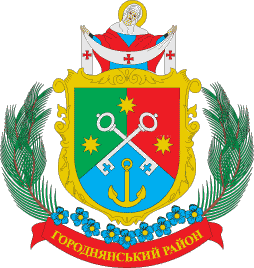
- Flag Coat of arms

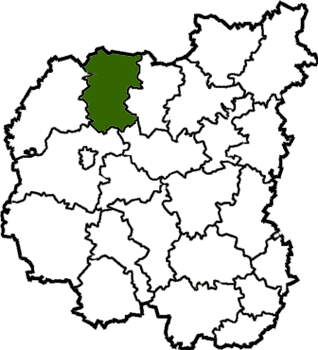
- Raion location in Chernihiv Oblast
- Coordinates: 51°54′9″N 31°30′52″E
- Country: Ukraine
- Oblast: Chernihiv Oblast
- Disestablished: 18 July 2020
- Admin. center: Horodnia

Area
  - Total: 1,566 km^{2} (605 sq mi)

Population (2020)
  - Total: 26,850
  - Density: 17.15/km^{2} (44.41/sq mi)
- Time zone: UTC+2 (EET)
  - Summer (DST): UTC+3 (EEST)
- Website: http://goradm.cg.gov.ua/

Horodnia Raion (Ukrainian: Городнянський район) was a raion (district) of Chernihiv Oblast, northern Ukraine. Its administrative centre was located at the town of Horodnia. The raion was abolished on 18 July 2020 as part of the administrative reform of Ukraine, which reduced the number of raions of Chernihiv Oblast to five. The area of Horodnia Raion was merged into Chernihiv Raion. The last estimate of the raion population was 26,850 (2020 est.)

At the time of disestablishment, the raion consisted of two hromadas:

- Horodnia urban hromada with the administration in Horodnia;
- Tupychiv rural hromada with the administration in the selo of Tupychiv.
