= Olyshivka settlement hromada =

Olyshivka settlement hromada Олишівська селищна громада
- Hromada
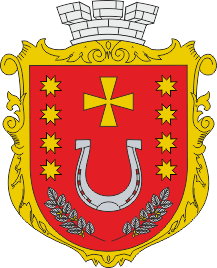
- Coat of arms
- Interactive map of Olyshivka settlement hromada
- Country: Ukraine
- Oblast: Chernihiv
- Raion: Chernihiv

Area
  - Total: 224.7 km^{2} (86.8 sq mi)

Population (2020)
  - Total: 3,262
  - Density: 14.52/km^{2} (37.60/sq mi)
- CATOTTG code: UA74100290000084770
- Settlements: 6
- Villages: 5
- Towns: 1
- Website: olyshivska.gromada.org.ua

Olyshivka settlement hromada (Ukrainian: Олишівська селищна громада) is a hromada of Ukraine, located in Chernihiv Raion, Chernihiv Oblast. The territory of the Olyshivka settlement hromada is located within the Dnieper Lowland, belonging to the Dnieper basin. Its administrative center is the town of Olyshivka.

It has an area of 224.7 square kilometres (86.8 mi^{2}) and a population of 3,262, as of 2020.

== Composition ==
The hromada includes 6 settlements: 1 town (Olyshivka) and 5 villages:

- Korosten
- Seredinka
- Sinozhatske
- Smolyanka
- Topchiivka

== Geography ==
The Olyshivka settlement hromada is located in the east of Chernihiv raion, bordering the Desna River in the west. The territory of the Olyshivka settlement hromada is located within the Dnieper Lowland, belonging to the Dnieper basin. A tributary of the Desna River - Smolyanka flows through the territory of the community. The relief of the surface of the community is a lowland, a slightly undulating plain, in places dissected by river valleys. There are oxbow lake and swamps in the Desna floodplain.

The climate of the Olyshivka settlement hromada is moderately continental, with warm summers and relatively mild winters. The average temperature in January is about -8°C, and in July - +20.0°C. The average annual precipitation ranges from 550 to 660 mm, with the highest amount of precipitation in the summer period.

The most common sod-podzolic soils. The Olyshivka settlement hromada is located in the natural zone of mixed forests, in Polissya. The main species in the forests are pine, oak, alder. Minerals - loam, peat, sand.

Regional roads and the international highway M-01 pass through the Olyshivka settlement hromada. There is no railway connection. The nearest railway station is located in Chernihiv.

== See also ==
- List of hromadas of Ukraine
