= Ripky Raion =

Former subdivision of Chernihiv Oblast, Ukraine

Ripky Raion Ріпкинський район
- Raion
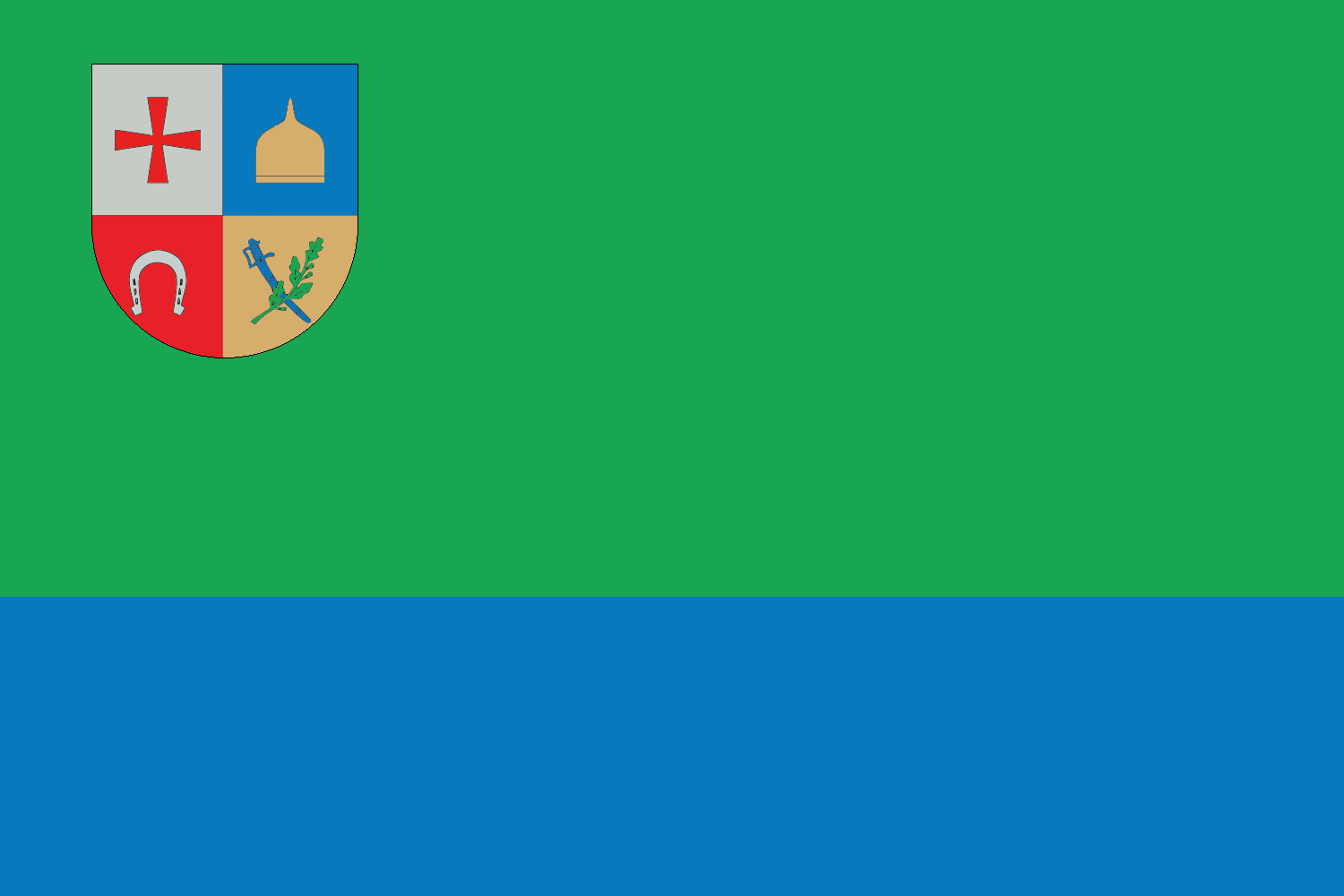
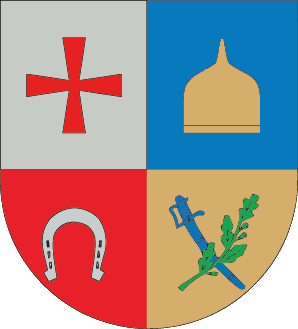
- Flag Coat of arms

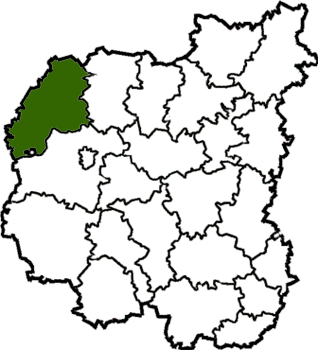
- Raion location in Chernihiv Oblast
- Coordinates: 51°47′36″N 30°56′37″E
- Country: Ukraine
- Oblast: Chernihiv Oblast
- Disestablished: 18 July 2020
- Admin. center: Ripky

Area
  - Total: 2,105 km^{2} (813 sq mi)

Population (2020)
  - Total: 25,646
  - Density: 12.18/km^{2} (31.55/sq mi)
- Time zone: UTC+2 (EET)
  - Summer (DST): UTC+3 (EEST)
- Website: http://rpadm.cg.gov.ua/

Ripky Raion (Ukrainian: Ріпкинський район) was a raion (district) of Chernihiv Oblast, northern Ukraine. Its administrative centre was located at the urban-type settlement of Ripky. The raion was abolished on 18 July 2020 as part of the administrative reform of Ukraine, which reduced the number of raions of Chernihiv Oblast to five. The area of Ripky Raion was merged into Chernihiv Raion. The last estimate of the raion population was 25,646 (2020 est.)

At the time of disestablishment, the raion consisted of three hromadas:

- Dobrianka settlement hromada with the administration in the urban-type settlement of Dobrianka;
- Liubech settlement hromada with the administration in the urban-type settlement of Liubech;
- Ripky settlement hromada with the administration in Ripky.
