= Honcharivske =

Rural locality in Chernihiv Oblast, Ukraine

Honcharivske Гончарівське
- Rural settlement
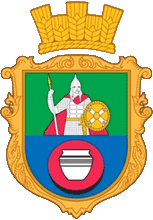
- Seal
- Interactive map of Honcharivske
- Location within Chernihiv Oblast Location within Ukraine
- Coordinates: 51°18′0″N 30°55′37″E
- Country: Ukraine
- Oblast: Chernihiv Oblast
- Raion: Chernihiv Raion
- Founded: 1952
- Urban-type settlement since: 1990
- Honcharivske village rada: Honcharivske

Area
  - Total: 0.47 km^{2} (0.18 sq mi)

Population (2022)
  - Total: 3,289
  - Density: 7,000/km^{2} (18,000/sq mi)
- Time zone: UTC+2 (EET)
  - Summer (DST): UTC+3 (EEST)
- Postal code: 15558
- Area code: +380 462
- KATOTTH: UA74100030010092910

Honcharivske (Ukrainian: Гончарівське) is a rural settlement in Chernihiv Raion, Chernihiv Oblast, northern Ukraine. It hosts the administration of Honcharivske settlement hromada, one of the hromadas of Ukraine. The territory of Honcharivske is located within the Dnieper Lowland, in the natural zone of mixed forests, in Polissya. Population: 3,289 (2022 estimate).

Until 26 January 2024, Honcharivske was designated as an urban-type settlement. On this day, a new law entered into force which abolished this status, and Honcharivske became a rural settlement.

== Geography ==
Goncharivske is located on the left bank of the Desna River, a tributary of the Dnieper, 38 km from the regional center - the city of Chernihiv. The territory of the community is located within the Dnieper Lowland. The relief of the village surface is a lowland plain.

The climate of Honcharivske is moderately continental, with warm summers and relatively mild winters. The average temperature in January is about -7 °C, and in July +19 °C. The average annual precipitation ranges from 550 to 660 mm, with the highest precipitation in the summer period.

The most common are sod-podzolic and meadow soils. Honcharivske is located in the natural zone of mixed forests, in Polissya. The main species in the forests are pine, oak, alder, ash, and birch. Mineral and other valuable natural deposits present within the settlement include loam, peat, and sand. Honcharivske specializes in forestry and growing grain crops.

On the territory of Honcharivske there is the Mizhrichynskyi Regional Landscape Park, in which pine forests are protected.

== Gallery ==
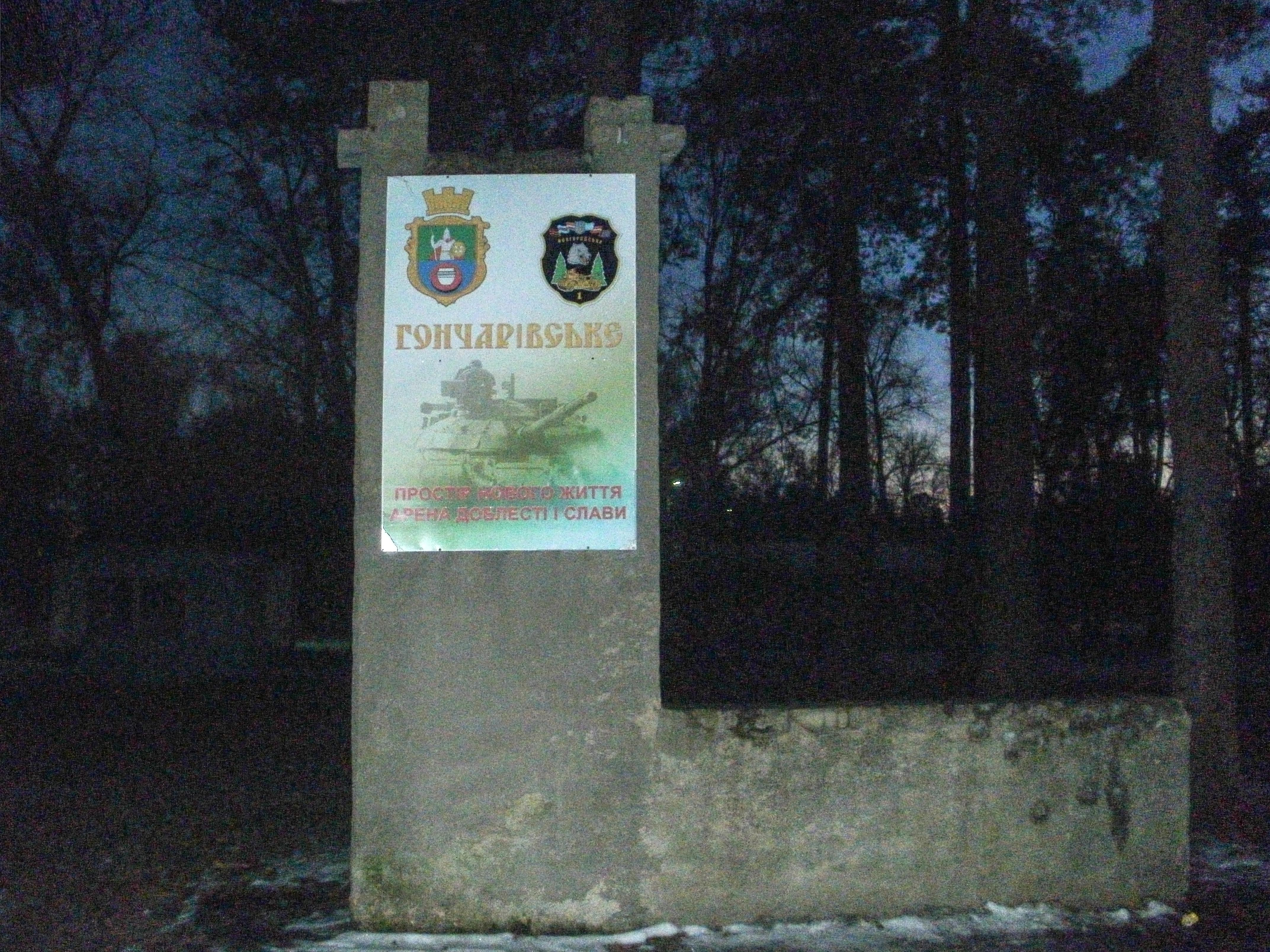
Sign of the town

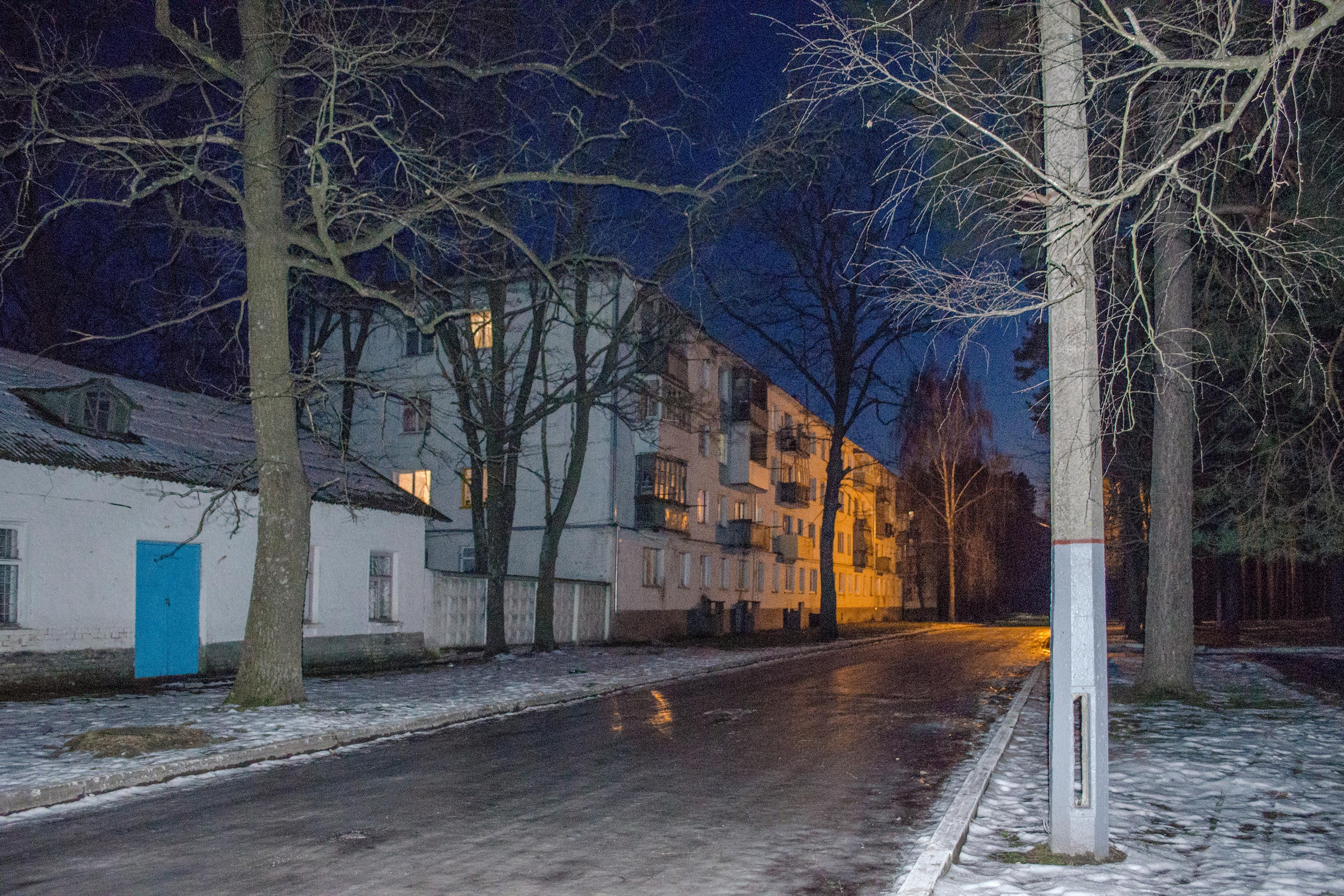
Street at night

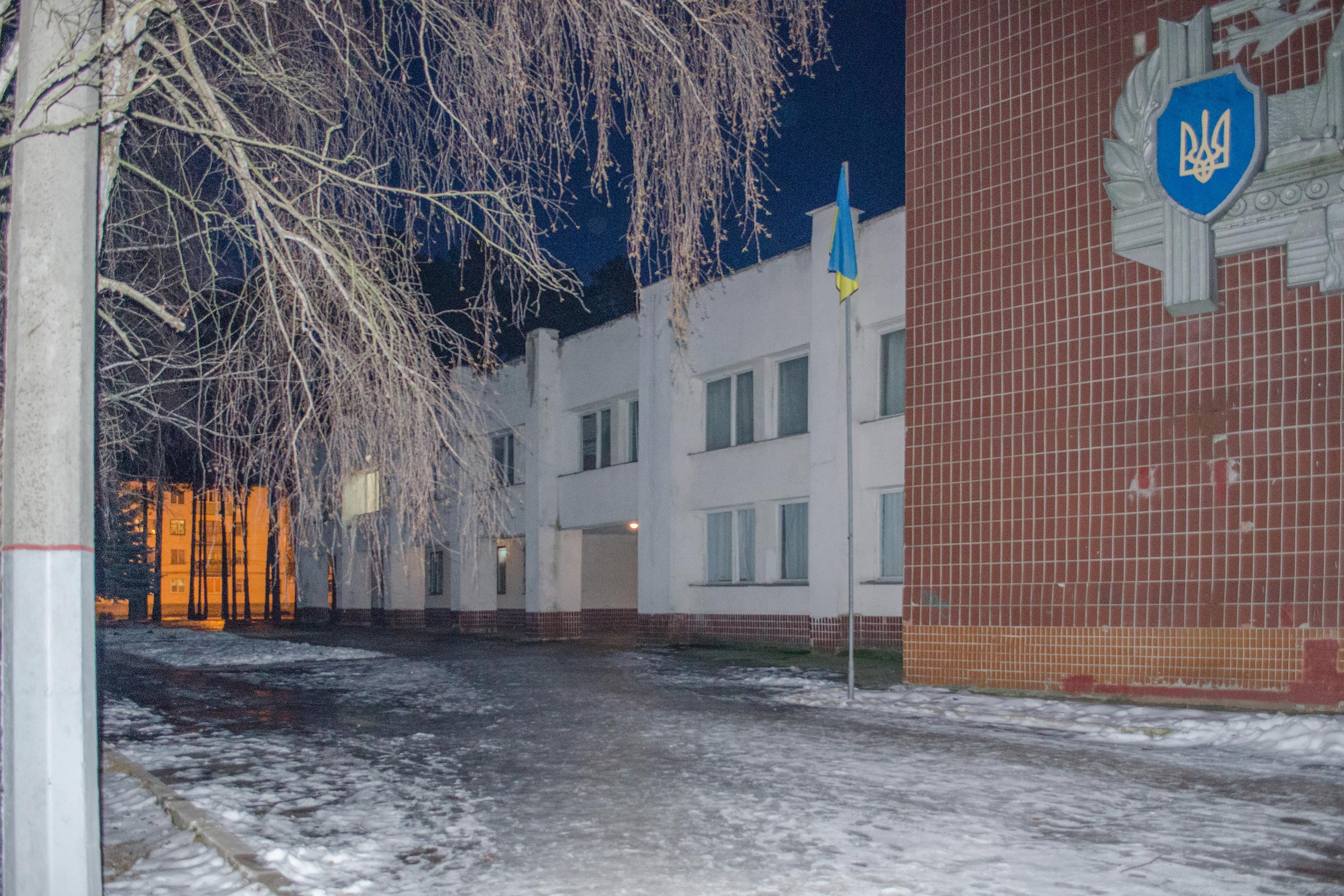
House of officers

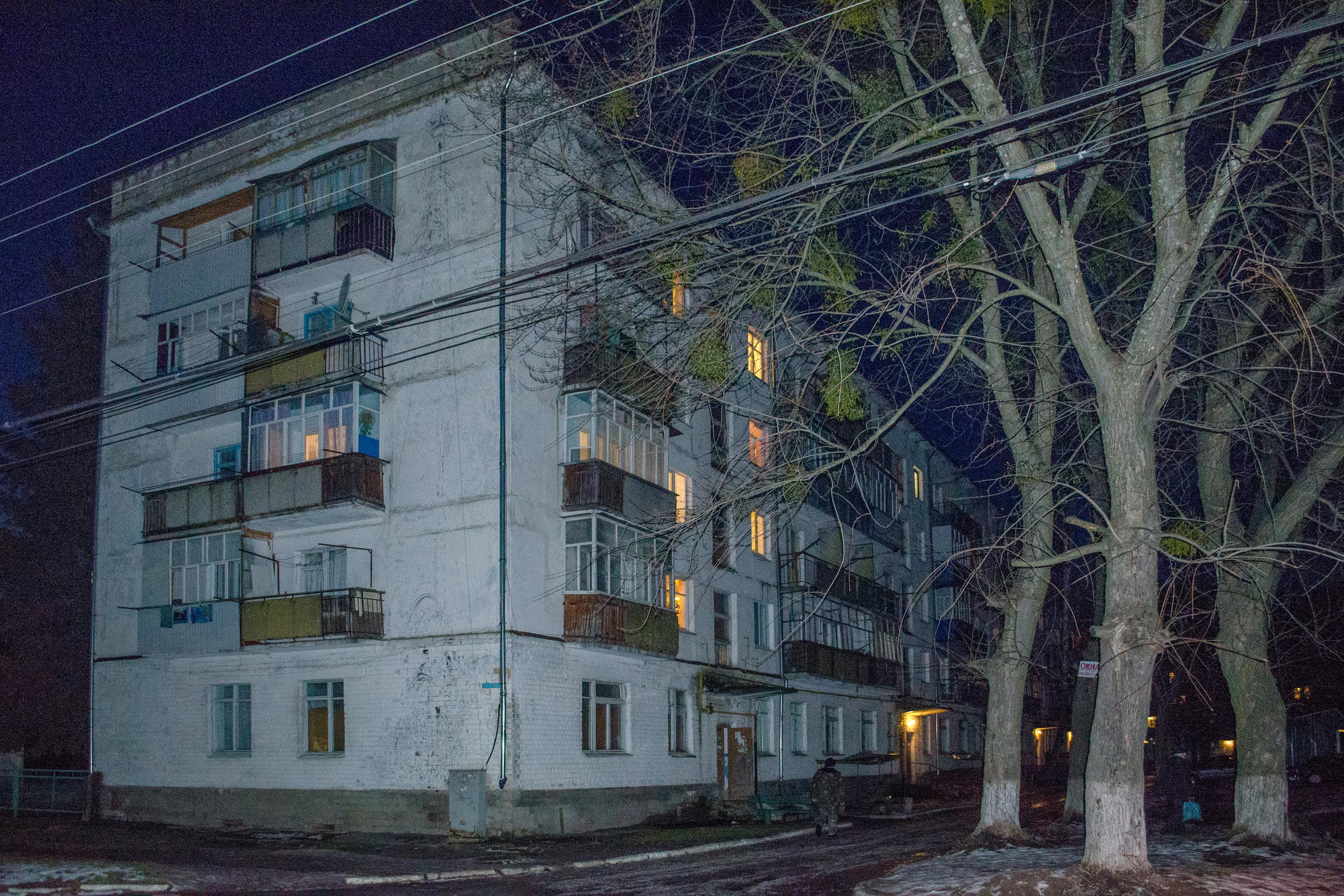
Just house

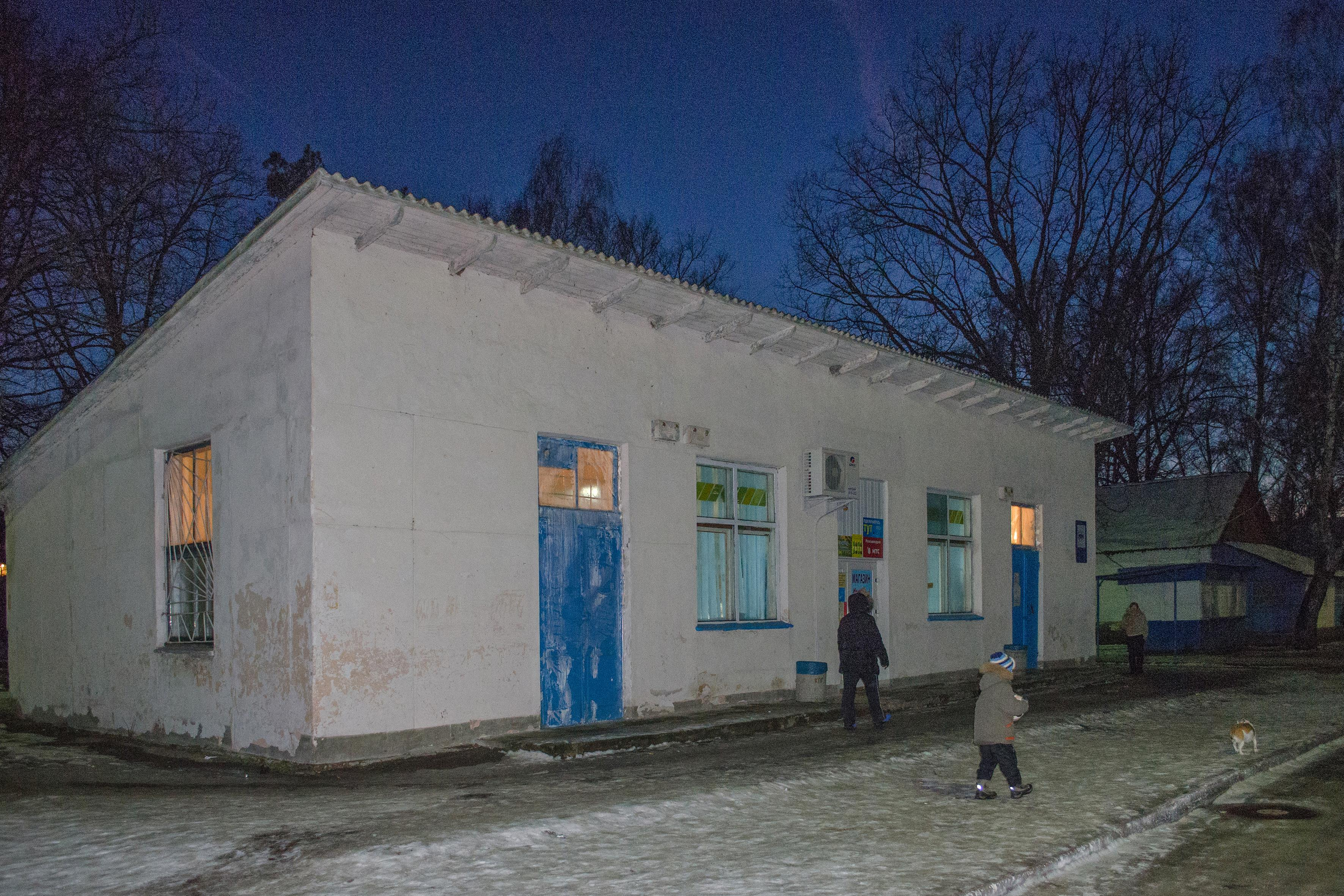
Bus station

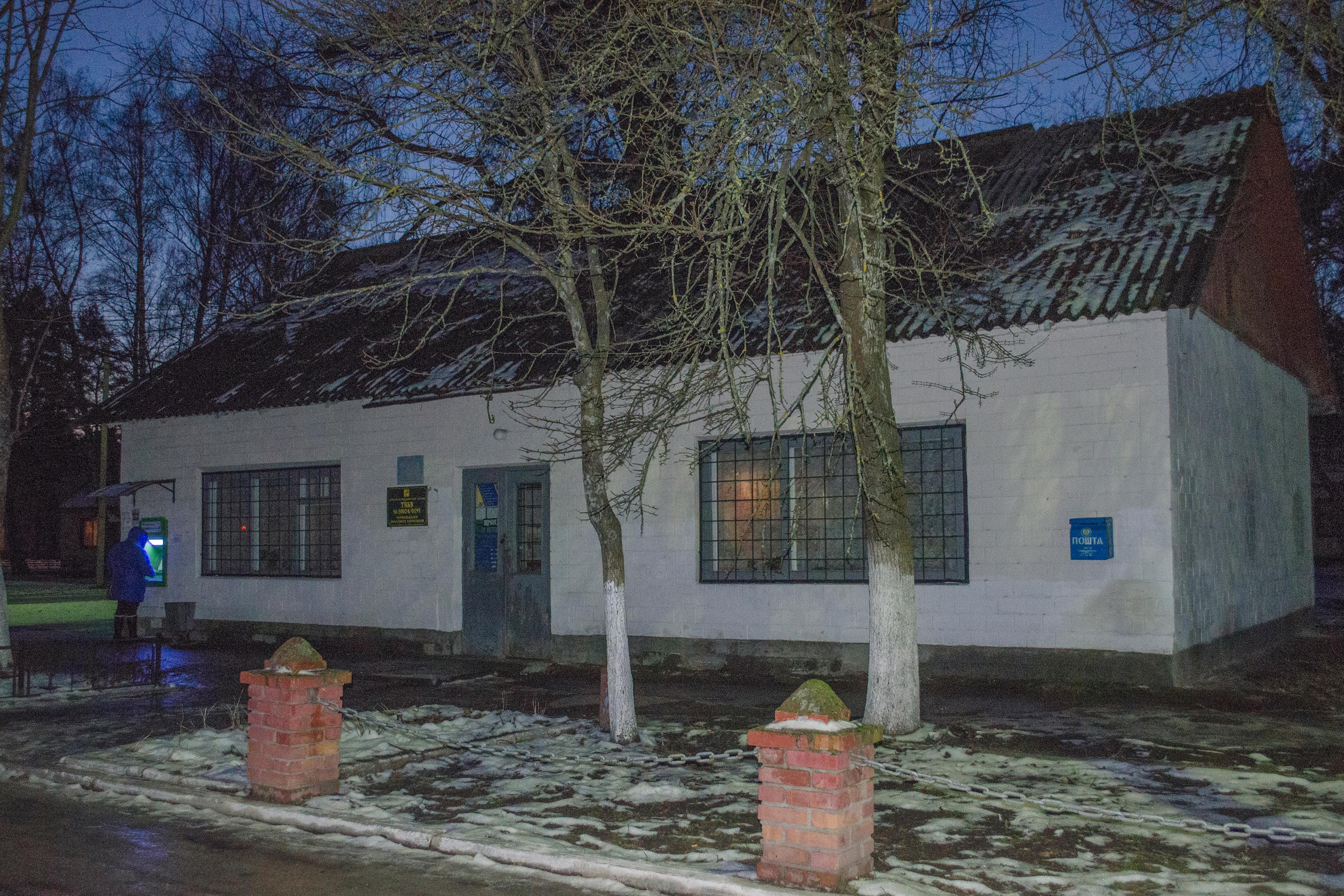
Bank

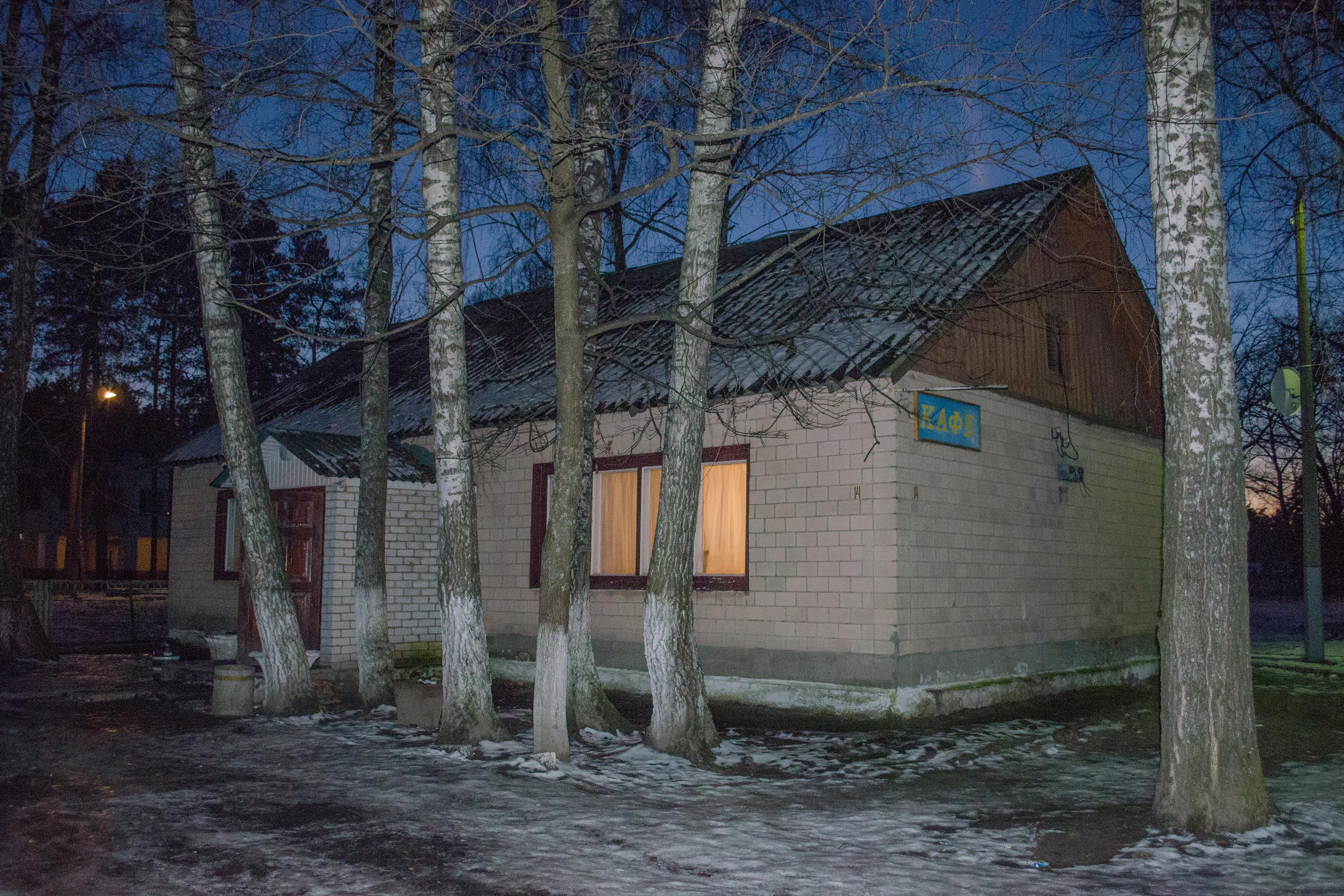
Cafe

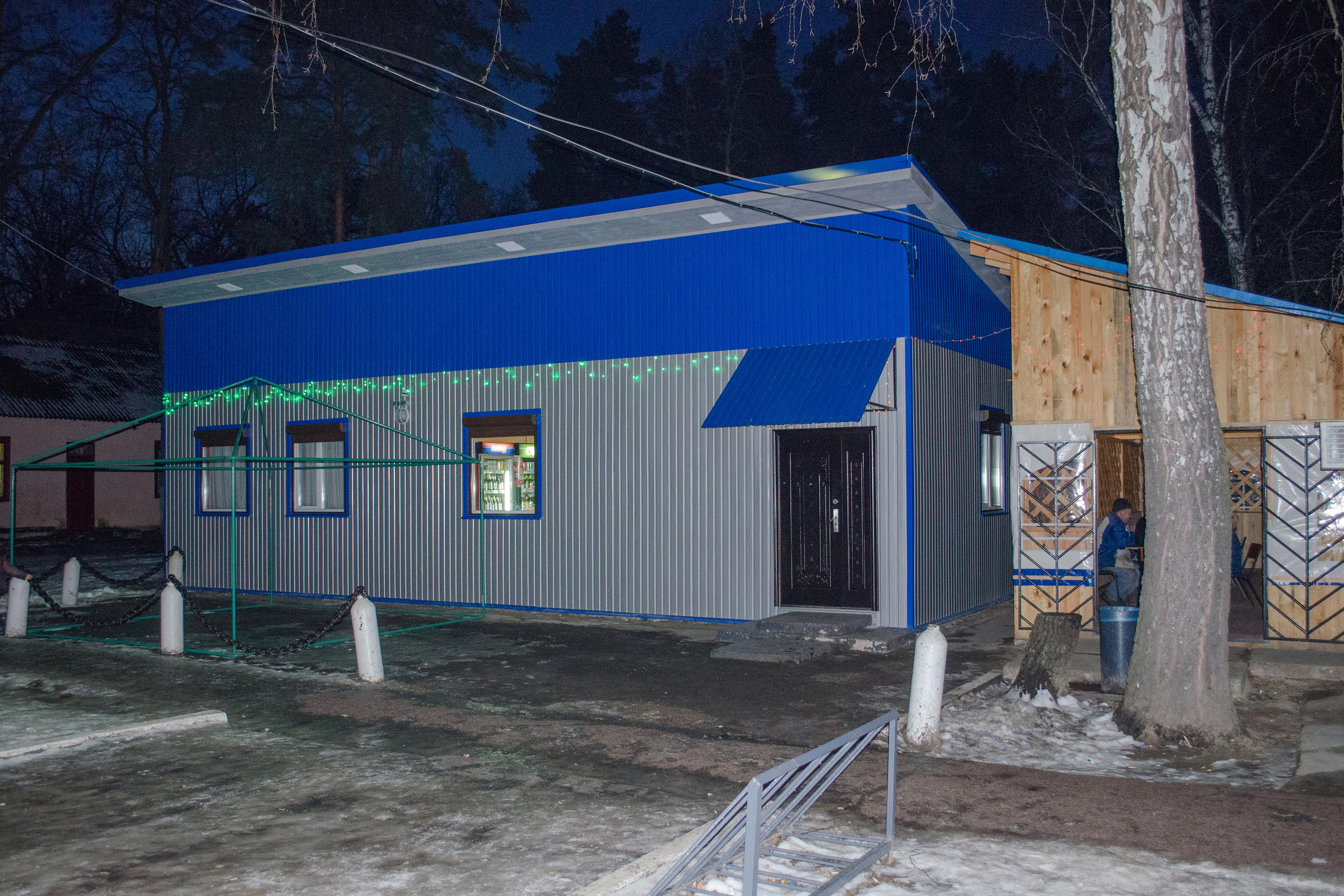
Shop

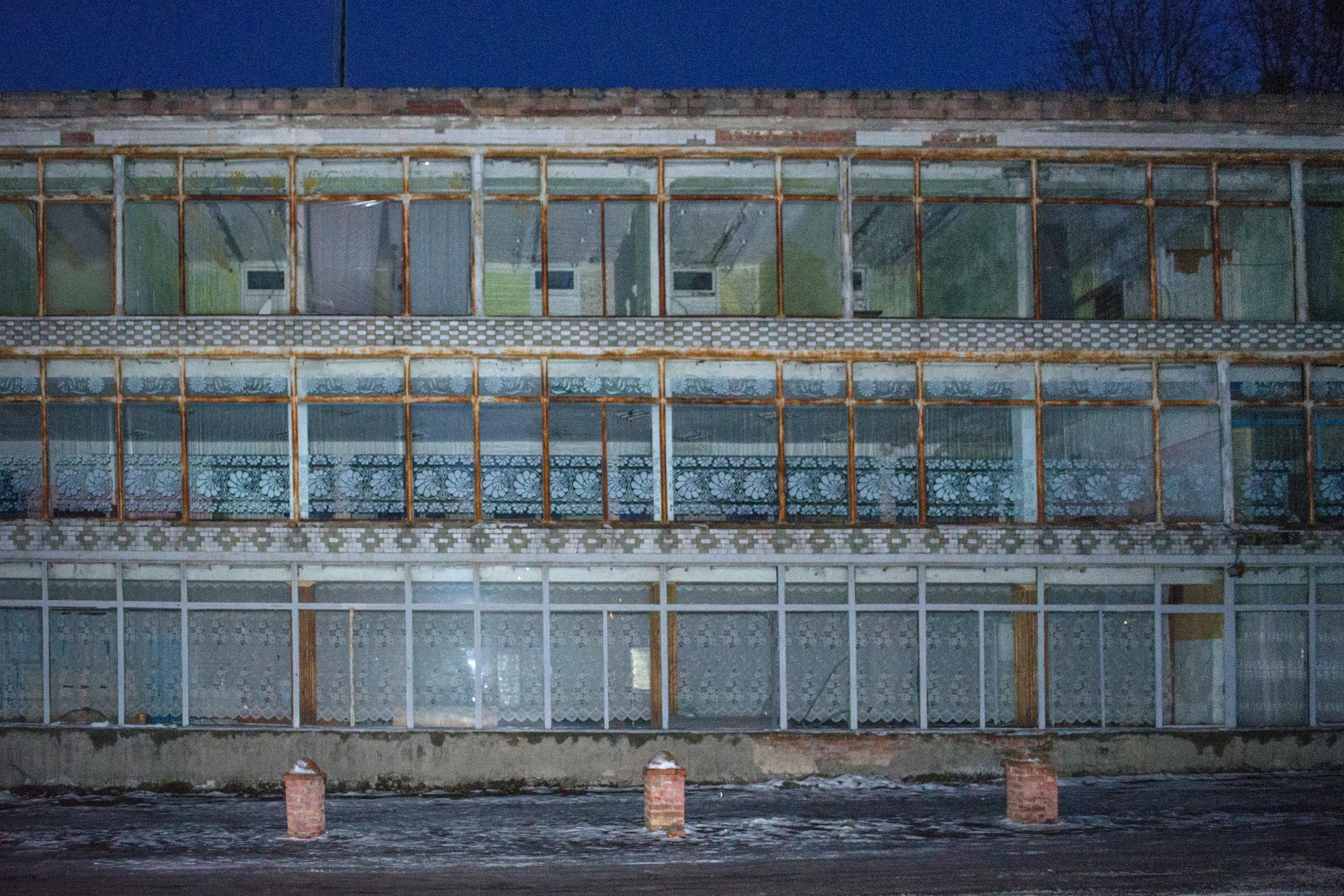
Abandoned shopping facilities
