= Liubech settlement hromada =

Liubech settlement hromada Любецька селищна громада
- Hromada
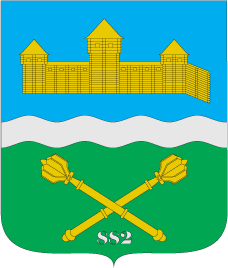
- Coat of arms
- Interactive map of Liubech settlement hromada
- Country: Ukraine
- Oblast: Chernihiv
- Raion: Chernihiv

Area
  - Total: 595.3 km^{2} (229.8 sq mi)

Population (2020)
  - Total: 5,473
  - Density: 9.194/km^{2} (23.81/sq mi)
- CATOTTG code: UA74100230000068041
- Settlements: 48
- Rural settlements: 3
- Villages: 44
- Towns: 1
- Website: liubech-gromada.gov.ua

Liubech settlement hromada (Ukrainian: Любецька селищна громада) is a hromada of Ukraine, located in Chernihiv Raion, Chernihiv Oblast. The Liubech settlement hromada is located within the Dnieper Lowland, on the left bank of the Dnieper, near the state border with the Republic of Belarus. The territory of the hromada is locatedIts administrative center is the town of Liubech.

It has an area of 595.3 square kilometres (229.8 mi^{2}) and a population of 5,473, as of 2020.

== Composition ==
In 2020, the territories of the Velykozliyiv Village Council, the Hubytsky Village Council, and the Nedanchytsky Village Council of the Ripkynsky District were included in the community, and the community entered the newly created Chernihiv Raion.

The hromada includes 48 settlements: 1 town (Liubech), 44 villages:

- Berezivka
- Velikiy Zliiv
- Vertecha
- Vorobyiv
- Halkiv
- Holubivka
- Hrabivka
- Hubari
- Hubichy
- Hunkivka
- Huta
- Dovhuny
- Dukhanki
- Kloniv
- Komarivka
- Korobky
- Korolcha
- Kukari
- Liskivka
- Maly Zliiv
- Malynivka
- Manky
- Mekshunivka
- Mysy
- Mokri Velichki
- Mohnachi
- Nedanchichi
- Nova Rudnya
- Pavlivka
- Petryki
- Pyshchyki
- Pushkine
- Radkivka
- Rozsudiv
- Rudnya
- Semaki
- Skitki
- Smolyhivka
- Taras Shevchenko
- Tulia
- Uhlova Rudnya
- Chisti Luzhi
- Shkuranka
- Shumany

And 3 rural-type settlements: Hirky, Levichivka, and Peresazh.

== Geography ==
The Liubech settlement hromada is located in the east of Chernihiv Oblast, on the left bank of the Dnieper, near the state border with the Republic of Belarus. The territory of the hromada is located within the Dnieper Lowland. The relief of the surface of the Liubech settlement hromada is a lowland plain, there are oxbow lake and artificial lakes in the floodplain of the river.

The climate of Liubech settlement hromada is moderately continental, with warm summers and relatively mild winters. The average temperature in January is about -7 °C, and in July - +19 °C. The average annual precipitation ranges from 550 to 660 mm, with the highest precipitation in the summer period.

The most common are sod-podzolic soils. The Liubech settlement hromada is located in the natural zone of mixed forests, in Polissya. 40% of the hromada area is covered by forests. The main species in the forests are pine, oak, birch. The impact of human economic activity on the nature of the community is very small. Minerals – loam, peat, sand.

Regional highways pass through the hromada, there is no railway connection.The nearest railway station is in the city of Slavutych.

== See also ==
- List of hromadas of Ukraine
