= Desna settlement hromada =

Desna settlement hromada Деснянська селищна громада
- Hromada
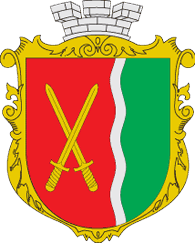
- Coat of arms
- Interactive map of Desna settlement hromada
- Country: Ukraine
- Oblast: Chernihiv
- Raion: Chernihiv

Area
  - Total: 710.0 km^{2} (274.1 sq mi)

Population (2020)
  - Total: 10,171
  - Density: 14.33/km^{2} (37.10/sq mi)
- CATOTTG code: UA74100070000057810
- Settlements: 13
- Villages: 12
- Towns: 1
- Website: desnyanska.gromada.org.ua

Desna settlement hromada (Ukrainian: Деснянська селищна громада) is a hromada of Ukraine, located in Chernihiv Raion, Chernihiv Oblast. Its administrative center is the rural settlement of Desna.

It has an area of 710.0 square kilometres (274.1 mi^{2}) and a population of 10,171, as of 2020.

== Composition ==
The hromada includes 13 settlements: 1 rural settlement (Desna) and 12 villages:

- Bir
- Vypovziv
- Karpylivka
- Koropye
- Kosachivka
- Loshakova Huta
- Lutava
- Morivsk
- Otrokhy
- Rudnya
- Sorokoshichi
- Tuzhar

== Geography ==
The Desna settlement hromada is located in the southwest of Chernihiv Raion. The hromada is located between the Dnipro River (west) and the Desna River (east). The hromada includes part of the Kyiv Reservoir.

Area – 710.0 km^{2}. The territory of the hromada is located within the Dnieper Lowland. The relief of the surface of the district is a lowland plain, sometimes dissected by river valleys.

The climate of Desna settlement hromada is moderately continental, with warm summers and relatively mild winters. The average temperature in January is about -7°C, and in July - +19°C. The average annual precipitation ranges from 550 to 660 mm, with the highest precipitation in the summer period.

The most common are sod-podzolic and meadow soils. The Desna settlement hromada is located in the natural zone of mixed forests, in Polissya. The main species in the forests are pine, oak, alder, ash, birch. Minerals – loam, peat, sand.

On the territory of the Desnyansk territorial community there is a hydrological natural monument of national importance "Holy Lake", an area of 70 hectares, and the Mizhrichynskyi Regional Landscape Park, an area of 78.3 thousand hectares.

== See also ==
- List of hromadas of Ukraine
