= Oster =

Urban locality in Chernihiv Oblast, Ukraine

Oster Остер
- City
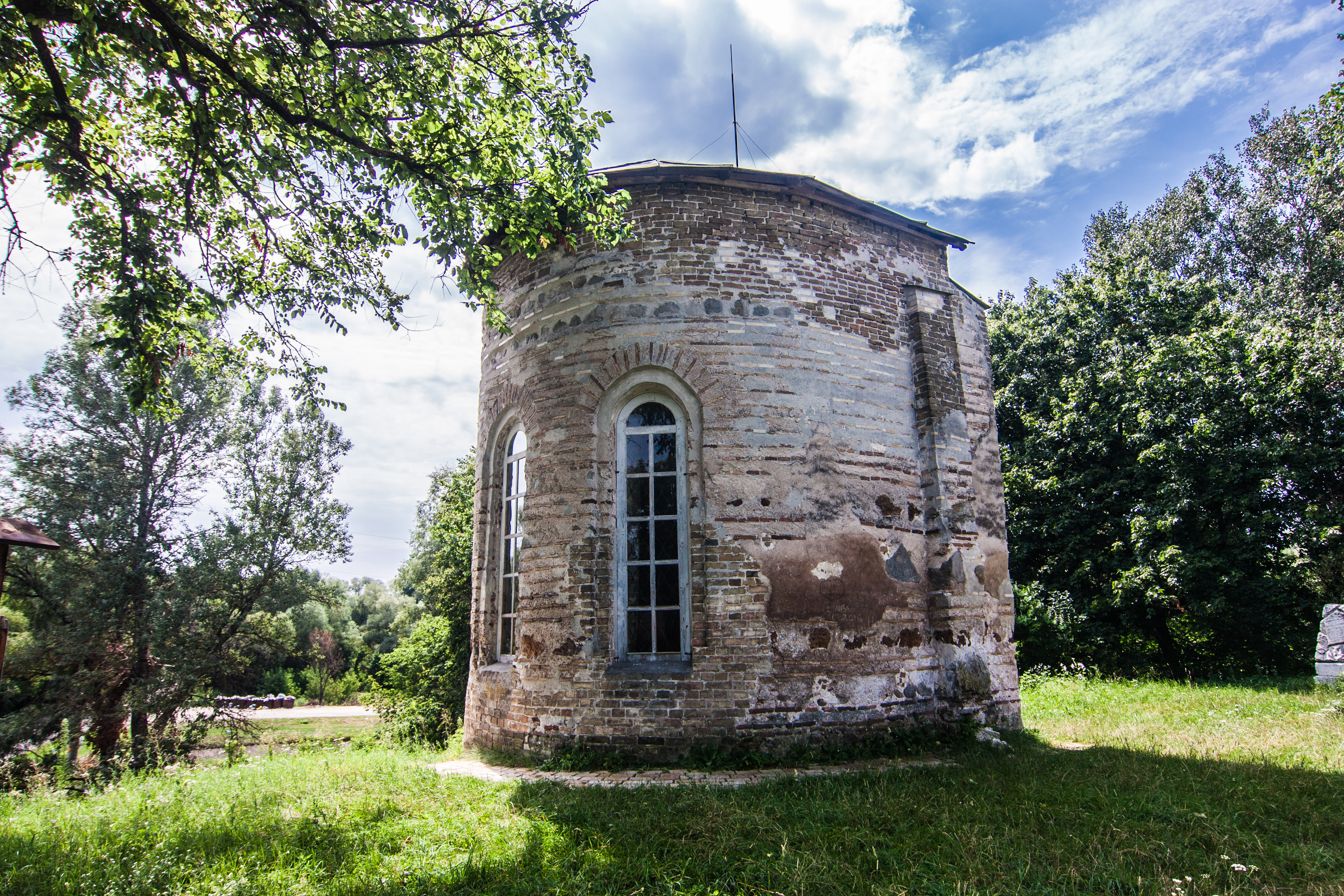
- Saint Michael's Church

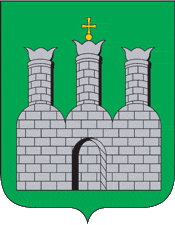
- Seal

- Location within Chernihiv Oblast Location within Ukraine
- Coordinates: 50°56′55″N 30°52′52″E
- Country: Ukraine
- Oblast: Chernihiv Oblast
- Raion: Chernihiv Raion
- Hromada: Oster urban hromada
- First mentioned: 1098
- Magdeburg rights: 1662

Area
  - Total: 76 km^{2} (29 sq mi)
- Elevation: 111 m (364 ft)

Population (2022)
  - Total: 5,564

Oster (Ukrainian: Остер, IPA: [osˈtɛr]) is a city in Chernihiv Raion, Chernihiv Oblast, Ukraine. It is located where the Oster River flows into the Desna. Oster hosts the administration of Oster urban hromada, one of the hromadas of Ukraine. Its population is 5,564 (2022 estimate).

Today Oster is a river port with a cotton-textile factory and a food industry. Some parts of the old fortress in Oster have been preserved, as have the remains of the Saint Michael's Church, constructed in 1098 and the only preserved church of the medieval principality of Pereiaslav.

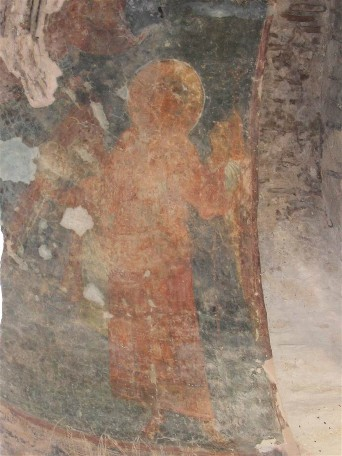
Ancient fresco in the Saint Michael's Church (a.k.a. Yurii's Temple) dating back to the turn of the 12th century.

== History ==
Oster was first mentioned in the Hypatian Codex under 1098 as Gorodets, a fortress of the Pereiaslav principality founded by Vladimir II Monomakh and later inherited by his son Yuri Dolgorukiy. It served as an outpost between Chernihiv and Kyiv and greatly suffered during wars between various princes. In 1240, Oster was destroyed by the Mongol invasion, after which it remained in ruins for a century. After the destruction of the fort, a village was built in its place, named Stary Oster or Starhorod (now a suburb called Starohorodka). In the beginning of the 14th century, a newer settlement arose closer to the Desna, named Oster.

From 1356 Oster was under control of the Grand Duchy of Lithuania, and from 1569 under the Union of Lublin which was part of the Polish–Lithuanian Commonwealth. In 1622, King Jan II Casimir granted Oster the Magdeburg rights and a coat of arms. In 1648, it became a sotnia town of Pereiaslav Regiment of the Cossack Hetmanate, later being transferred to Kyiv Regiment. After harsh battles of the Khmelnytsky Uprising, Polish rule was reestablished, but in February 1664, with support from the local population, the Poles were driven back by Cossacks and the Russians. In 1781 Oster was designated a povit town of Kiev Viceroyalty. In 1797 it was incorporated into the Little Russian Governorate, and in 1802 became part of Chernigov Governorate.

Until 18 July 2020, Oster belonged to Kozelets Raion. The raion was abolished in July 2020 as part of the administrative reform of Ukraine, which reduced the number of raions of Chernihiv Oblast to five. The area of Kozelets Raion was merged into Chernihiv Raion.

== Economy and infrastructure ==
Oster is a river port specializing in food industry and production of textiles. A technical school and a local museum were established in the city.

== Points of interest ==
- Saint Michael's Church, also known as George's (Yuri's) Church, originally built in 1098, has been conservated during the early 20th century and preserves remains of frescoes.

== Notable people ==
- Serhiy Poyarkov (born 1965), artist and public figure
