= Dobrianka settlement hromada =

Dobrianka settlement hromada Добрянська селищна громада
- Hromada
- Interactive map of Dobrianka settlement hromada
- Country: Ukraine
- Oblast: Chernihiv
- Raion: Chernihiv

Area
  - Total: 460.5 km^{2} (177.8 sq mi)

Population (2020)
  - Total: 4,983
  - Density: 10.82/km^{2} (28.03/sq mi)
- CATOTTG code: UA74100090000064336
- Settlements: 21
- Villages: 20
- Towns: 1
- Website: dobryanska-gromada.gov.ua

Dobrianka settlement hromada (Ukrainian: Добрянська селищна громада) is a hromada of Ukraine, located in Chernihiv Raion, Chernihiv Oblast.The Dobrianka settlement hromada is located near the state border of Ukraine with Belarus. Its administrative center is the town of Dobrianka.

It has an area of 460.5 square kilometres (177.8 mi^{2}) and a population of 4,983, as of 2020.

== Composition ==
The hromada includes 21 settlements: 1 town (Dobrianka) and 20 villages:

- Atkilnya
- Verbivka
- Vyr
- Hornostaevka
- Hrybova Rudnya
- Huta-Tkachova
- Zavodskoe
- Kiselyvka
- Klubivka
- Lyzunova Rudnya
- Nova Papirnia
- Novi Yarylovichi
- Oleksandrivka
- Oleksandrivka Druha
- Oleshnya
- Sidelivka
- Skytok
- Stari Yarylovichi
- Stroivka
- Chyzhivka

== Geography ==
The Dobrianka settlement hromada is located in the north of Chernihiv Raion, near the state border of Ukraine with Belarus.

Area – 460.5 km^{2}. The territory of the hromada is located within the Dnieper Lowland. The relief of the surface of the district is a lowland plain, sometimes dissected by river valleys. All rivers belong to the Dnieper basin.

The climate of Dobrianka settlement hromada is moderately continental, with warm summers and relatively mild winters. The average temperature in January is about -7°C, and in July - +19°C. The average annual precipitation ranges from 550 to 660 mm, with the highest precipitation in the summer period.

The most common are sod-podzolic and gray forest soils. The Dobrianka settlement hromada is located in the natural zone of mixed forests, in Polissya. The main species in the forests are pine, oak, alder, ash, birch. Minerals – loam, peat, sand. The Dobrianka settlement hromada specializes in forestry.

The European route E95 passes through the district. The railway from Chernihiv passes through the Dobrianka settlement hromada.

== See also ==
- List of hromadas of Ukraine
