= Horodnia =

Urban locality in Chernihiv Oblast, Ukraine

Horodnia Городня
- City
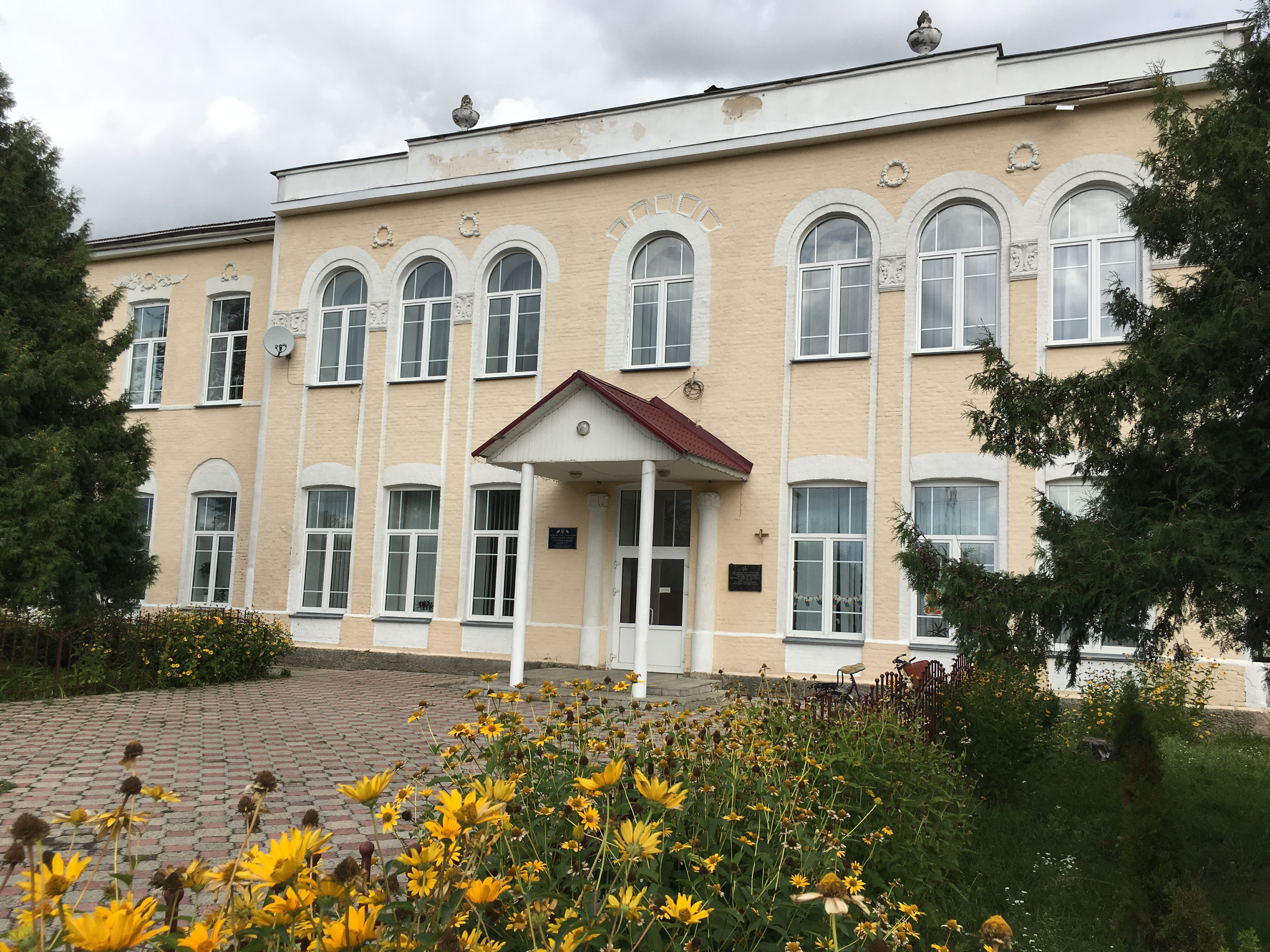
- School No. 2

- Seal

- Location within Chernihiv Oblast Location within Ukraine
- Coordinates: 51°53′35″N 31°35′41″E
- Country: Ukraine
- Oblast: Chernihiv Oblast
- Raion: Chernihiv Raion
- Hromada: Horodnia urban hromada
- Founded: 1550

Area
  - Total: 12.2 km^{2} (4.7 sq mi)

Population (2022)
  - Total: 11,506
- Website: http://gorodnya.net

Horodnia (Ukrainian: Городня, pronounced [ɦoroˈdʲnʲɑ]) is a small city in Chernihiv Raion, Chernihiv Oblast, Ukraine. Horodnia hosts the administration of Horodnia urban hromada, one of the hromadas of Ukraine. Population: 11,240 (2023 estimate), 11,506 (2022 estimate).

== Geography ==
Horodnia is situated on both banks of the Chybryzh River.

== History ==
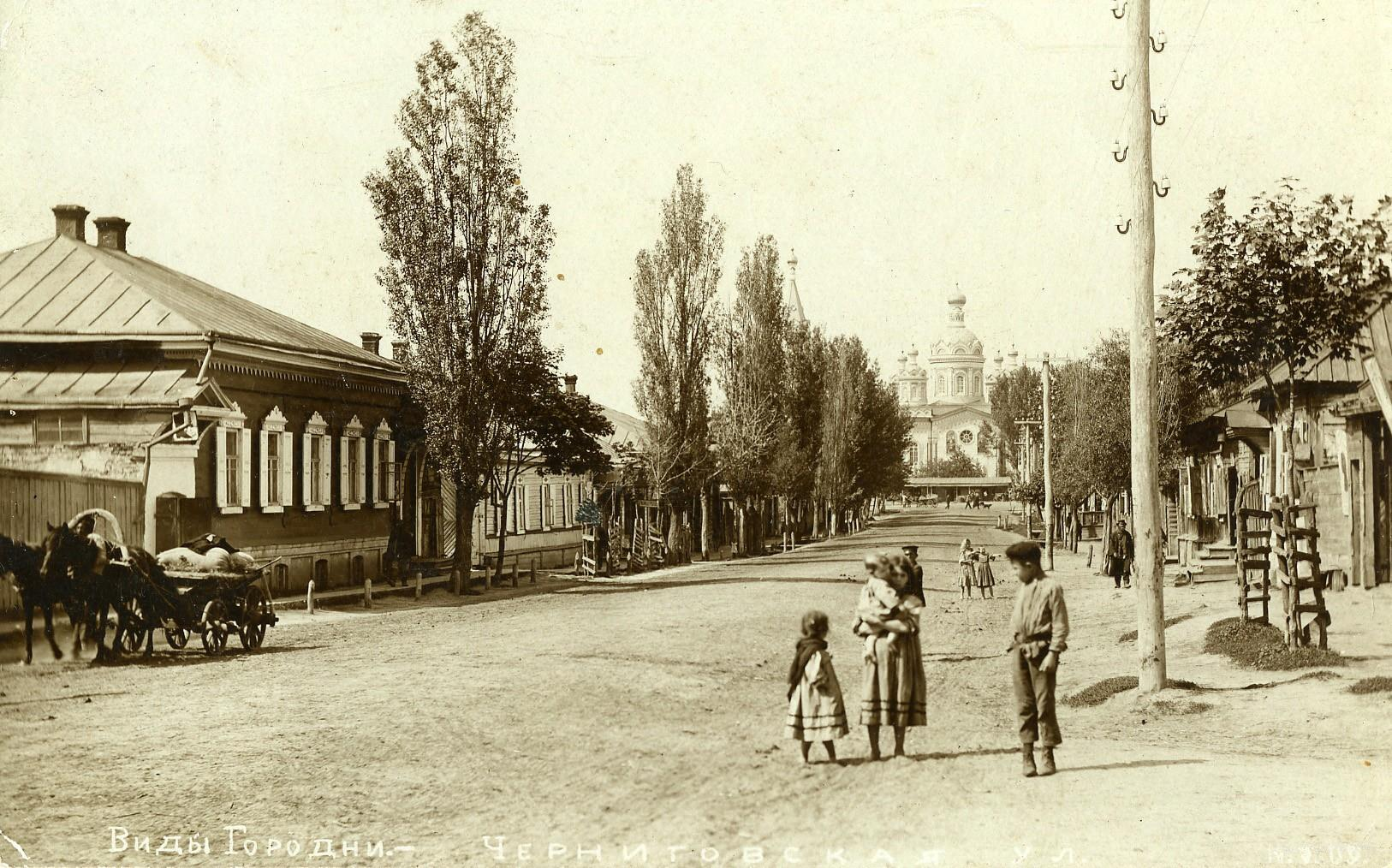
Horodnia in the early 20th century

Horodnia was first mentioned in historical literature at the beginning of the 17th century. There are different ideas about the origin of its name.

A source of local pride comes from three cannons presented by Peter I for the heroism of the people of Horodnia during the Swedish invasion in 1709.

From 1782 and until the Revolution of 1917 Horodnia served as a povit centre. In 1932 the town's population reached 5,000 inhabitants. It has had city status since 1957.

Until 18 July 2020, Horodnia was the administrative center of Horodnia Raion. The raion was abolished in July 2020 as part of the administrative reform of Ukraine, which reduced the number of raions of Chernihiv Oblast to five. The area of Horodnia Raion was merged into Chernihiv Raion.

Horodnia was occupied by Russian forces during the ongoing Russo-Ukrainian war. Russian forces were reported to have left the town on 1 April 2022.

== Population ==
=== Language ===
Distribution of the population by native language according to the 2001 census:

Language	Number	Percentage
Ukrainian	12 049	86.14%
Russian	1 876	13.41%
Other or undecided	62	0.45%
Total	13 987	100.00%

== Education ==
The town has two secondary schools, two boarding schools, a music school, and a sport school.

== Notable people ==
Many famous people were born, lived and studied in Horodnia. Among them are poets Vasyl Chumak, Abram Katsnelson, Petro Pynytsia, ethnographer Stepan Nis; Mykola Volkovych, doctor and professor; and politician and Hero of Ukraine Levko Lukyanenko. Former politician and the Prime Minister of Ukraine Oleksiy Honcharuk grew up and finished school in Horodnia.
