= Kozelets =

Rural locality in Chernihiv Oblast, Ukraine

Kozelets Козелець
- Rural settlement
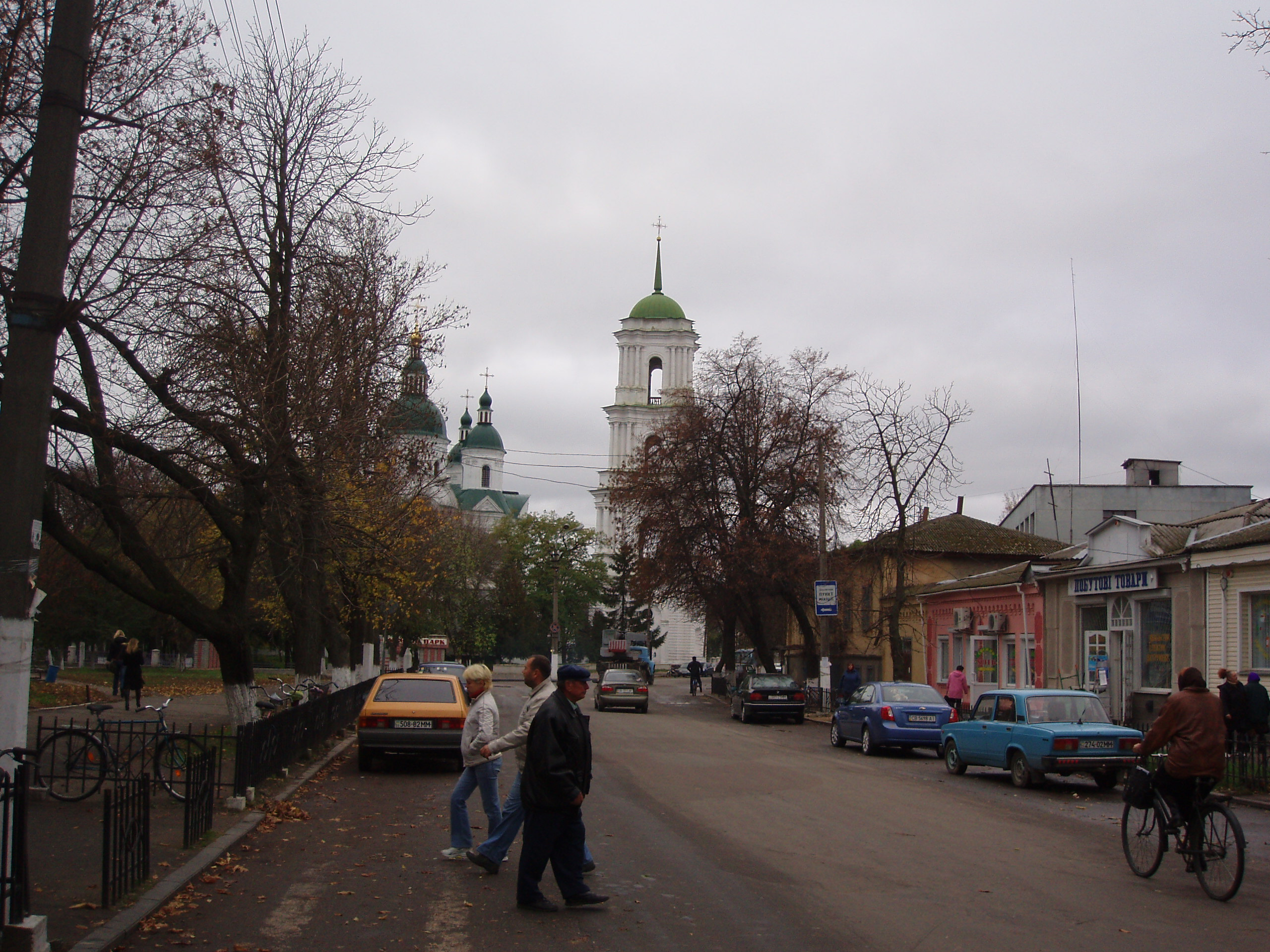
- The town's main street, with the belltower in the background.

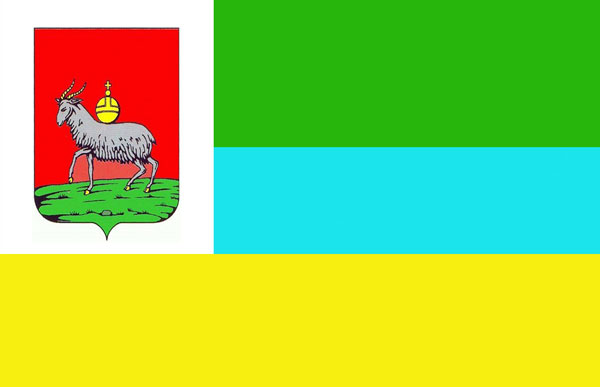
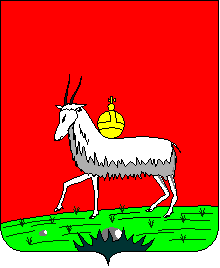
- Flag Coat of arms
- Interactive map of Kozelets
- Location of Kozelets in Ukraine Kozelets (Ukraine)
- Coordinates: 50°54′0″N 31°07′0″E
- Country: Ukraine
- Oblast: Chernihiv Oblast
- Raion: Chernihiv Raion
- Hromada: Kozelets settlement hromada
- First mentioned: 1098
- Magdeburg rights: 1656
- Town status: 1924

Government
  - Head: Petro Fedchenko

Area
  - Total: 8.44 km^{2} (3.26 sq mi)

Population (2022)
  - Total: 7,496
  - Density: 1,037.67/km^{2} (2,687.6/sq mi)
- Time zone: UTC+2 (EET)
  - Summer (DST): UTC+3 (EEST)
- Postal code: 17003
- Area code: +380 4646
- Website: http://rada.gov.ua/

Kozelets (Ukrainian: Козелець, IPA: [kozeˈlɛt͡sʲ, koˈzɛlet͡sʲ]) is a rural settlement in Chernihiv Raion, Chernihiv Oblast, northern Ukraine. It hosts the administration of Kozelets settlement hromada, one of the hromadas of Ukraine. Population: 7,496 (2022 estimate).

First mentioned in written documents in 1098, Kozelets enjoyed city rights starting from the mid-17th century, but lost that status after being designated as an urban-type settlement in 1924.

Notable attractions in the city includes the Cathedral of the Nativity of the Blessed Virgin designed in the Ukrainian Baroque style by architects Ivan Hryhorovych-Barskyi and Andrei Kvasov. Kozelets also houses several local food industries, and a veterinary technicum.

== Geography ==
Kozelets is located on the Oster River, a tributary of the Dnieper. It lies in the geographical area of Dnieper Lowland.

== History ==
Kozelets was first mentioned in 1098 as a fortified town in the East Slavic state of Kievan Rus'. During times of the Polish–Lithuanian Commonwealth, Kozelets was known by the name Kozlohrad (Ukrainian: Козлоград).

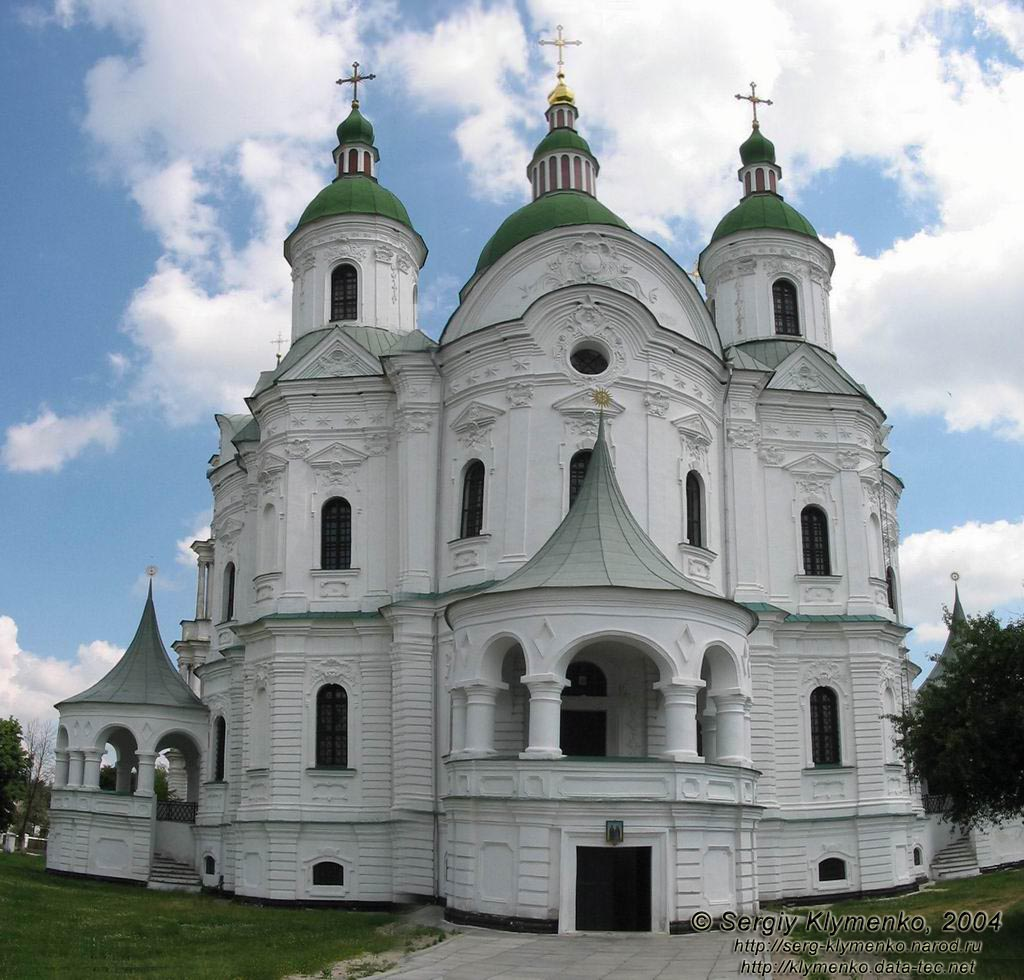
The town's main cathedral, designed by Ivan Hryhorovych-Barskyi and Andrei Kvasov.

In the beginning of the seventeenth century, Kozelets was an important regional trade center. The town was also a sotnia town in the Pereiaslav and Kyiv Regiments of the Cossack Hetmanate during the seventeenth-eighteenth centuries.

In 1656, Kozelets was granted the Magdeburg rights. The Kozelets Cossack Rada elected Yakym Somko as the Hetman of the Cossacks in 1662. After the Tatar invasion of 1679, Kozelets was partially destroyed.

In 1744 Empress Elizabeth of Russia stayed in Kozelets while making a pilgrimage to Kyiv.

Between 1781 and 1917 Kozelets served as a district center of the Kiev, Little Russia and Chernigov Governorates of the Russian Empire. At the end of the nineteenth century, Kozelets's population was 5,420.

After the breakup of the Russian Empire and Russian Civil War, Kozelets became a part of the Soviet Union. In 1924, its status as a city was removed and replaced with that of an urban-type settlement. During World War II, the Nazi Einsatzgruppen executed 125 of the town's Jews, a population that numbered 2,000 before the war.

Until 18 July 2020, Kozelets was the administrative center of Kozelets Raion. The raion was abolished in July 2020 as part of the administrative reform of Ukraine, which reduced the number of raions of Chernihiv Oblast to five. The area of Kozelets Raion was merged into Chernihiv Raion.

Until 26 January 2024, Kozelets was designated urban-type settlement. On this day, a new law entered into force which abolished this status, and Kozelets became a rural settlement.

== Attractions ==
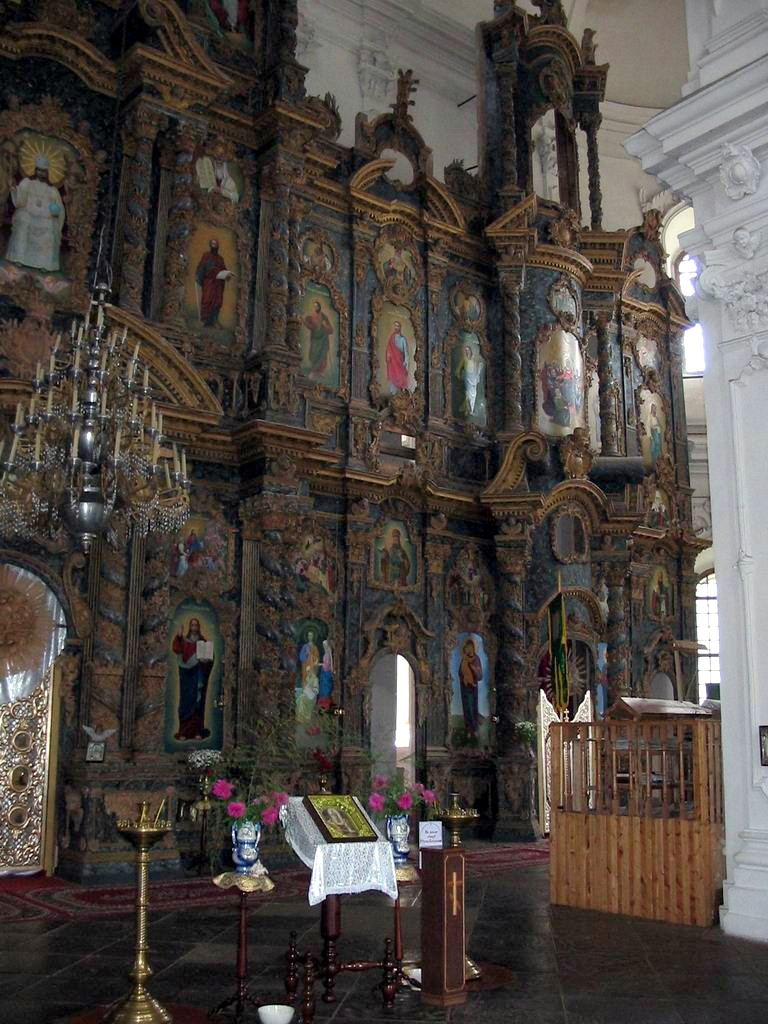
The cathedral's hand-crafted iconostasis was made in Italy.

Formerly a regimental Cossack town, Kozelets has some important architectural monuments. This includes the Regimental Chancellery Building (built in 1755, now town hall), the Darahan Mansion complex, the Saint Michael's Church (built in 1784) and the Ascension Church (1864–66).

The town's main cathedral and architectural attraction is the Cathedral of the Nativity of the Blessed Virgin. The cathedral was built in 1752-1763 in late Ukrainian Baroque style by architects Ivan Hryhorovych-Barskyi and Andrei Kvasov. Funds for the construction of the cathedral were provided by Alexey and Kyrylo Rozumovsky (the latter was appointed Hetman in 1750). In 1766-1770 a multi-storeyed belfry was added to the cathedral.

== Notable people ==
List of famous people from Kozelets:

- Bella Abzug (1920–1998), American congresswoman and activist whose mother emigrated from Ukraine
- Yevstafiy Bogomolets (between 1750 and 1755–1811) - the mayor of Kozelets in 1789, direct ancestor of academician Alexander A. Bogomolets (1881–1946) and Olga Bogomolets (1966), M.D., the founder of Radomysl Castle
- Yuriy Levitansky (1922–1996), Russian poet
- Boris Mankevsky (1883–1962), Ukrainian neurologist
- Vladimir Negovsky (1909–2003), Russian pathophysiologist
- Maria Vasillievna Pavlova (née Gortynskaia) (1854-1939) paleontologist and academician
