= Kipti rural hromada =

Kipti rural hromada Кіптівська сільська громада
- Hromada
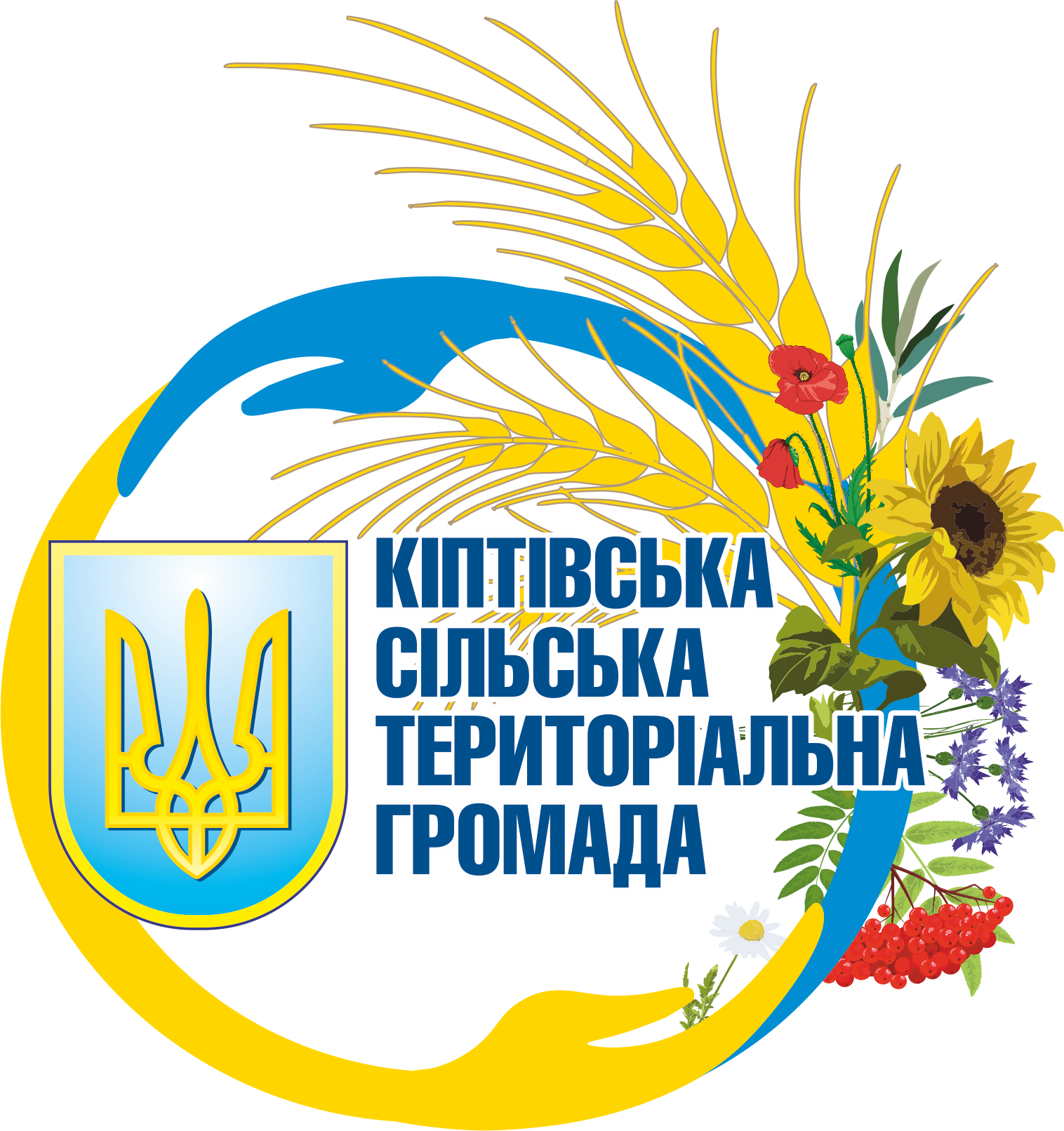
- Seal
- Interactive map of Kipti rural hromada
- Country: Ukraine
- Oblast: Chernihiv
- Raion: Chernihiv

Area
  - Total: 537.6 km^{2} (207.6 sq mi)

Population (2020)
  - Total: 5,578
  - Density: 10.38/km^{2} (26.87/sq mi)
- CATOTTG code: UA74100170000043593
- Settlements: 15
- Villages: 15
- Website: kiptivska.gromada.org.ua

Kipti rural hromada (Ukrainian: Кіптівська сільська громада) is a hromada of Ukraine, located in Chernihiv Raion, Chernihiv Oblast. Its administrative center is the village of Kipti. The Kipti rural hromada is located within the Dnieper Lowland, in the natural zone of mixed forests, in Polissya. It has an area of 537.6 square kilometres (207.6 mi^{2}) and a population of 5,578, as of 2020.

== Composition ==
The hromada contains 19 settlements, with 18 villages and 1 rural-type settlement: Prohres. Villages of the community:

- Borsukiv
- Vovchok
- Haiove
- Halchyn
- Dymerka
- Kipti
- Kopachiv
- Krasylivka
- Nadynivka
- Novy Shlyah
- Olbyn
- Podlisne
- Rozivka
- Savinka
- Samiylivka
- Khreschate
- Chemer
- Shpakiv

The largest village in the community of Progress has 833 residents (2024)

== Geography ==
The territory of the hromada is located in the center the Chernihiv Raion. The Desna River (Dnieper basin) flows through the west of the hromada. The total area of the territory of the Ivanovka territorial hromada is 537.6 km^{2}.

The Kipti rural hromada is located within the Dnieper Lowland. The relief of the surface of the district is a lowland plain, there are many oxbow lake in the floodplains of rivers.

The climate of Kipti rural hromada is moderately continental, with warm summers and relatively mild winters. The average temperature in January is about -7°C, and in July - +19°C. The average annual precipitation ranges from 550 to 660 mm, with the highest precipitation in the summer period.

The most common are sod-podzolic and gray forest soils. The Kipti rural hromada is located in the natural zone of mixed forests, in Polissya. The main species in the forests are pine, oak, alder, birch. Minerals – loam, peat. The Kipti rural hromada has developed forestry, vegetable and grain growing, and pig farming.

The European route E95 passes through the Kipti rural hromada. The railway from Chernihiv passes through the hromada.

== See also ==
- List of hromadas of Ukraine
