= Oster (river) =

Oster, Остер
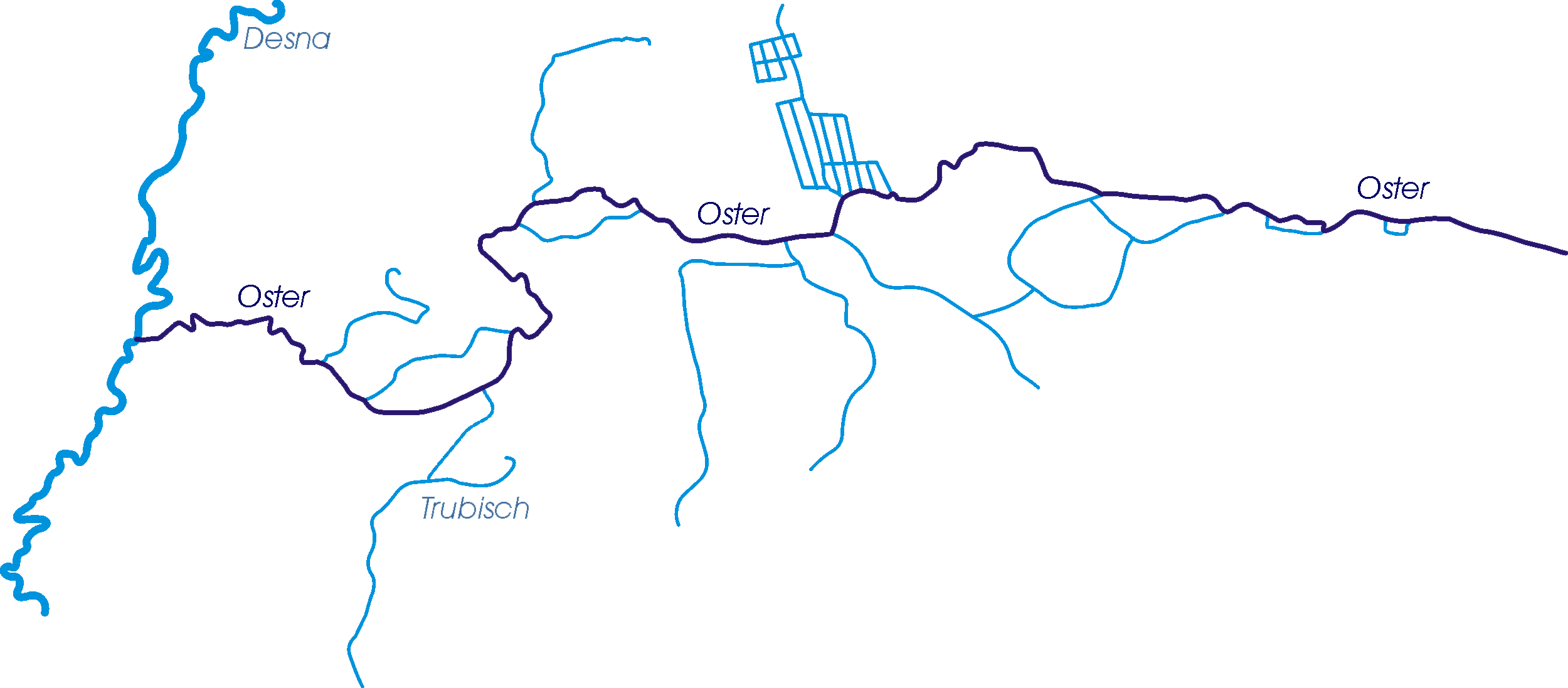
- The watershed of the Oster

Location
- Country: Ukraine

Physical characteristics
- Source
  - location: Chernihiv Oblast
- Mouth: Desna
  - coordinates: 50.936°N 30.8478°E
- Length: 199 km (124 mi)
- Basin size: 2,950 km^{2} (1,140 sq mi)
- Discharge
  - average: 3,2 m³/s

Basin features
- Progression: Desna→ Dnieper→ Dnieper–Bug estuary→ Black Sea

The Oster (Ukrainian: Остер; Russian: Остёр, Ostyor) is a river in the northern Ukrainian oblast of Chernihiv. The river is a left tributary of the Desna River. It is approximately 199 km long and its basin area is 2,950 km^{2}. It is connected by canals and streams with the Trubizh River, which flows southwest from Kyiv into the Dnieper River. Important towns and villages on the river include: Nizhyn, Kozelets and Oster.
