= Ripky settlement hromada =

Ripky settlement hromada Ріпкинська селищна громада
- Hromada
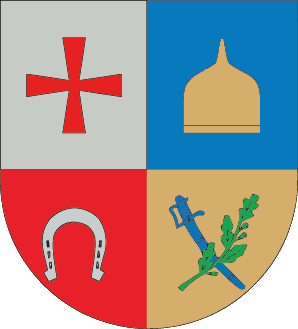
- Coat of arms
- Interactive map of Ripky settlement hromada
- Country: Ukraine
- Oblast: Chernihiv
- Raion: Chernihiv

Area
  - Total: 1,013.3 km^{2} (391.2 sq mi)

Population (2020)
  - Total: 14,578
  - Density: 14.387/km^{2} (37.261/sq mi)
- CATOTTG code: UA74100330000029082
- Settlements: 49
- Villages: 46
- Towns: 3
- Website: ripkynska.gromada.org.ua

Ripky settlement hromada (Ukrainian: Ріпкинська селищна громада) is a hromada of Ukraine, located in Chernihiv Raion, Chernihiv Oblast. The hromada is located in the northwest of Chernihiv Raion, within the Dnieper Lowland, near the state border of Ukraine with Belarus. Its administrative center is the town of Ripky.

It has an area of 1,013.3 square kilometres (391.2 mi^{2}) and a population of 14,578, as of 2020.

== Composition ==
The hromada includes 49 settlements: 3 towns (Ripky, Zamhlai, and Radul) and 46 villages:

- Bahany
- Bykholtsokhivka
- Buyanki
- Velika Vis
- Velyki Osnyaki
- Verbychi
- Vysokyn
- Vyshneve
- Hlynenko
- Holubichi
- Hrabiv
- Huchyn
- Danichi
- Zaderiivka
- Zvenichiv
- Zubahy
- Kamianka
- Kisli
- Korchevya
- Kraskivske
- Kratyn
- Lovyn
- Lopatni
- Maly Listven
- Molochki
- Mutychiv
- Novosilky
- Novoukrainske
- Peredil
- Petrushi
- Pylypcha
- Piznopaly
- Plekhtiivka
- Pristoron
- Pushkari
- Rashkova Sloboda
- Senyuki
- Syberez
- Sulychivka
- Suslivka
- Tamarivka
- Trudove
- Ubizhichi
- Chudivka
- Chumak
- Yamishche

== Geography ==
The Ripky settlement hromada is located in the northwest of Chernihiv Raion, near the state border of Ukraine with Belarus. The territory of the hromada is located within the Dnieper Lowland. The relief of the surface of the district is a lowland plain, sometimes dissected by river valleys. All rivers belong to the Dnieper basin.

The climate of Ripky settlement hromada is moderately continental, with warm summers and relatively mild winters. The average temperature in January is about -8°C, and in July - +19°C. The average annual precipitation ranges from 550 to 660 mm, with the highest precipitation in the summer period.

The most common are sod-podzolic and gray forest soils. The Ripky settlement hromada is located in the natural zone of mixed forests, in Polissya. The main species in the forests are pine, oak, alder, ash, birch. Minerals – loam, peat, sand. The Ripky settlement hromada specializes in forestry.

The European route E95 passes through the hromada. The railway from Chernihiv passes through the Ripky settlement hromada.

== See also ==
- List of hromadas of Ukraine
