= Chernihiv Raion =

Subdivision of Chernihiv Oblast, Ukraine

Chernihiv Raion Чернігівський район
- Raion
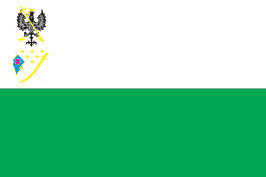
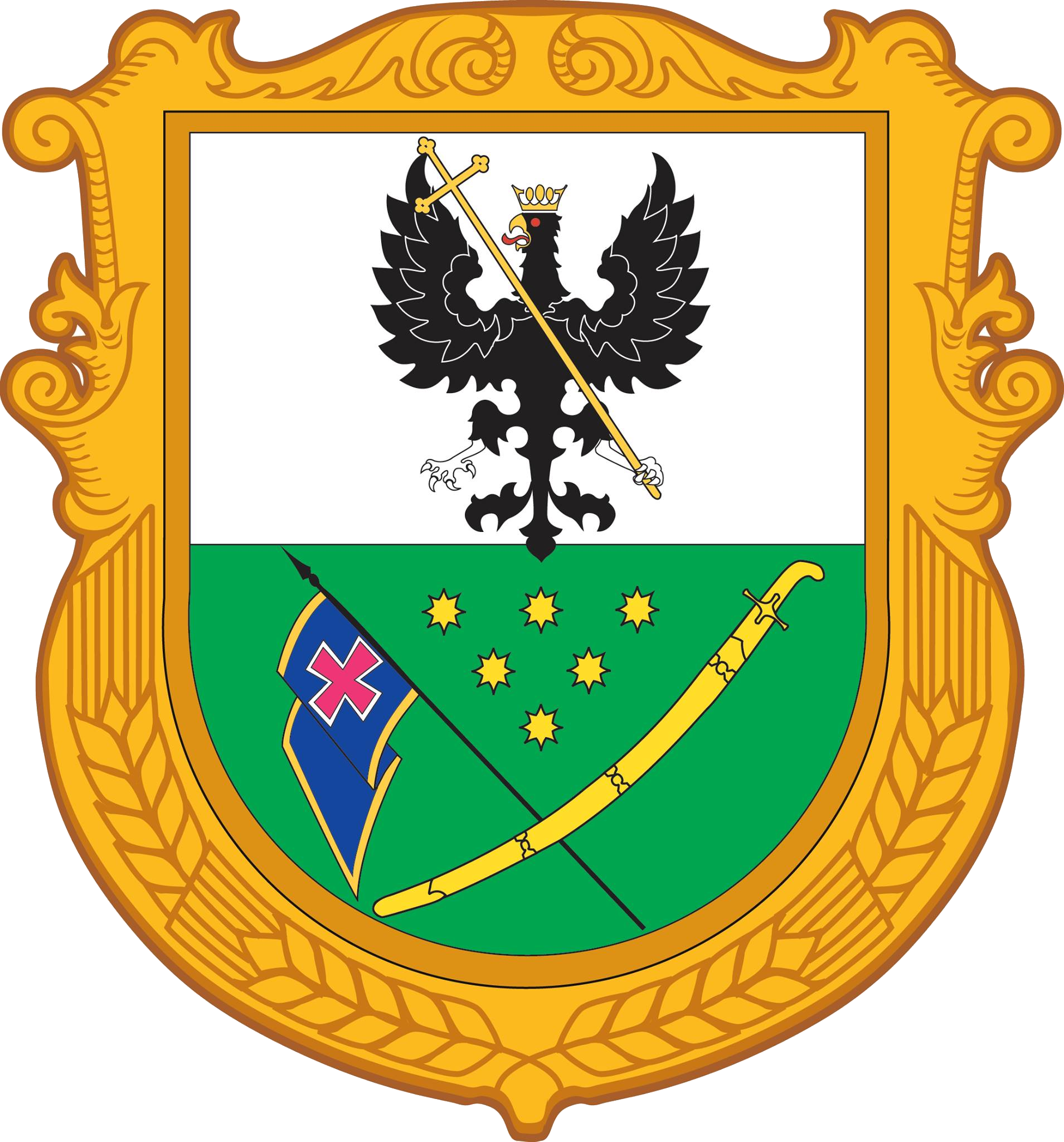
- Flag Coat of arms

- Raion location in Chernihiv Oblast
- Coordinates: 51°29′N 31°17′E
- Country: Ukraine
- Oblast: Chernihiv
- Admin. center: Chernihiv
- Subdivisions: 20 hromadas

Area
  - Total: 10,203.9 km^{2} (3,939.7 sq mi)
- Elevation: 130 m (430 ft)

Population (2022)
  - Total: 445,430
  - Density: 43.653/km^{2} (113.06/sq mi)
- Time zone: UTC+2 (EET)
  - Summer (DST): UTC+3 (EEST)
- Website: Official website

Chernihiv Raion (Ukrainian: Чернігівський район) is a raion (district) of Chernihiv Oblast, northern Ukraine. Its administrative centre is the city of Chernihiv. Population: 445,430 (2022 estimate).

On 18 July 2020, as part of the administrative reform of Ukraine, the number of raions of Chernihiv Oblast was reduced to five, and the area of Chernihiv Raion was significantly expanded. Four abolished raions, Horodnia, Kozelets, Kulykivka, and Ripky Raions, as well as part of Mena Raion and the city of Chernihiv, which was previously incorporated as a city of oblast significance and did not belong to the raion, were merged into Chernihiv Raion. Before the expansion, the raion covered an area of 2,547 square kilometres (983 mi^{2}). The January 2020 estimate of the raion population was 51,152 (2020 est.).

== Subdivisions ==
=== Current ===
After the reform in July 2020, the raion consists of 20 hromadas:

- Berezna settlement hromada with the administration in the rural settlement of Berezna, transferred from Mena Raion;
- Chernihiv urban hromada with the administration in the city of Chernihiv, was previously a city of oblast significance;
- Desna settlement hromada with the administration in the rural settlement of Desna, transferred from Kozelets Raion;
- Dobrianka settlement hromada with the administration in the rural settlement of Dobrianka, transferred from Ripky Raion;
- Honcharivske settlement hromada with the administration in the rural settlement of Honcharivske, retained from Chernihiv Raion;
- Horodnia urban hromada with the administration in the city of Horodnia, transferred from Horodnia Raion;
- Ivanivka rural hromada with the administration in the selo of Ivanivka, retained from Chernihiv Raion;
- Kipti rural hromada with the administration in the selo of Kipti, transferred from Kozelets Raion;
- Kozelets settlement hromada with the administration in the rural settlement of Kozelets, transferred from Kozelets Raion;
- Kulykivka settlement hromada with the administration in the rural settlement of Kulykivka, transferred from Kulykivka Raion;
- Kyinka rural hromada with the administration in the selo of Kyinka, retained from Chernihiv Raion;
- Kyselivka rural hromada with the administration in the selo of Kyselivka, retained from Chernihiv Raion;
- Liubech settlement hromada with the administration in the rural settlement of Liubech, transferred from Ripky Raion;
- Mykhailo-Kotsiubynske settlement hromada with the administration in the rural settlement of Mykhailo-Kotsiubynske, retained from Chernihiv Raion;
- Novyi Bilous rural hromada with the administration in the selo of Novyi Bilous, retained from Chernihiv Raion;
- Olyshivka settlement hromada with the administration in the rural settlement of Olyshivka, retained from Chernihiv Raion;
- Oster urban hromada with the administration in the city of Oster, transferred from Kozelets Raion;
- Ripky settlement hromada with the administration in the rural settlement of Ripky, transferred from Ripky Raion;
- Sedniv settlement hromada, with the administration in the rural settlement of Sedniv, retained from Chernihiv Raion;
- Tupychiv rural hromada with the administration in the selo of Tupychiv, transferred from Horodnia Raion.

=== Before 2020 ===
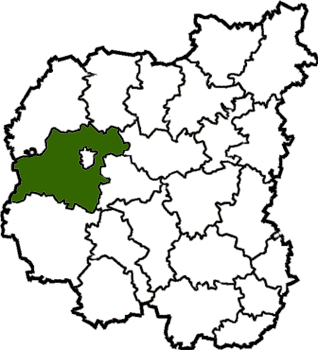
Chernihiv Raion in Chernihiv Oblast before 2020

Before the 2020 reform, the raion consisted of eight hromadas:

- Honcharivske settlement hromada with the administration in Honcharivske;
- Ivanivka rural hromada with the administration in Ivanivka;
- Kyinka rural hromada with the administration in Kyinka;
- Kyselivka rural hromada with the administration in Kyselivka;
- Mykhailo-Kotsiubynske settlement hromada with the administration in Mykhailo-Kotsiubynske;
- Novyi Bilous rural hromada with the administration in Novyi Bilous;
- Olyshivka settlement hromada with the administration in Olyshivka;
- Sedniv settlement hromada with the administration in Sedniv.

== Geography ==
Chernihiv raion is located in the west of Chernihiv Oblast. The district borders on the southwest with the Kyiv Oblast, on the north - with the Republic of Belarus and the Russian Federation.

The area of the raion is 10,203.9 square kilometres (3,939.7 mi^{2}).The territory of the raion is located within the Dnieper Lowland. The relief of the surface of the district is a lowland, slightly undulating plain, sometimes dissected by river valleys. All rivers belong to the Dnieper basin. The largest rivers are the Dnieper, Desna with tributaries Snov and Oster. The Kyiv Reservoir is located in the raion .

The climate of Chernihiv raion is moderately continental, with warm summers and relatively mild winters. The average temperature in January is about -7°C, and in July - +19°C. The average annual precipitation ranges from 550 to 660 mm, with the highest precipitation in the summer period.

The most common are sod-podzolic and gray forest soils. Chernihiv raion is located in the natural zone of mixed forests, in Polissya. The main species in the forests are pine, oak, alder, ash, birch. Minerals – loam, peat, sand, brown coal.

An international highway to Odessa runs through Chernihiv raion, the railways are subordinate to the South-Western Railway. The largest transport hub is Chernihiv.

== See also ==
- Chernihiv–Ovruch railway
