= Ripky =

Rural locality in Chernihiv Oblast, Ukraine

Ripky Ріпки
- Rural settlement
- Location within Chernihiv Oblast Location within Ukraine
- Coordinates: 51°47′58″N 31°5′0″E
- Country: Ukraine
- Oblast: Chernihiv Oblast
- Raion: Chernihiv Raion
- First mentioned: 1607

Area
  - Total: 7.33 km^{2} (2.83 sq mi)
- Elevation: 139 m (456 ft)

Population (2022)
  - Total: 6,643
  - Density: 906/km^{2} (2,350/sq mi)
- Postal code: 15000
- Area code: +380 4641
- Vehicle registration: CB / 25

Ripky (Ukrainian: Ріпки) is a rural settlement in Chernihiv Raion, Chernihiv Oblast, northern Ukraine. The village of Hlynenka is subordinated to Ripky. It hosts the administration of Ripky settlement hromada, one of the hromadas of Ukraine. Population: 6,643 (2022 estimate).

== History ==
Ripky is first mentioned in written sources in 1607. The population of Ripky actively participated in the national liberation struggle led by Bohdan Khmelnytsky. The town was a Royiska Sotnia (village Royische near Chernihiv) Chernihiv Regiment at the beginning of the 19th century. - Parish center.

In 1905-1907 Ripky was a center for the revolutionary actions of the peasants. During the Russian Civil War many of the residents acted as guerrilla groups, which entered the Bogunskiy regiment.

In 1943 residents acted as underground district committees of the party and guerrilla group. On September 26, 1943, Nazi troops were driven out of Ripky by the Red Army.

In 1958, Ripky was designated an urban-type settlement.

Until 18 July 2020, Ripky was the administrative center of Ripky Raion. The raion was abolished in July 2020 as part of the administrative reform of Ukraine, which reduced the number of raions of Chernihiv Oblast to five. The area of Ripky Raion was merged into Chernihiv Raion.

There were clashes in Ripky between the Ukrainian Armed Forces and the invading Russian Armed Forces in the area from 24 February 2022, with multiple Russian convoys destroyed in ongoing clashes.

Until 26 January 2024, Ripky was designated urban-type settlement. On this day, a new law entered into force which abolished this status, and Ripky became a rural settlement.

== Demographics ==
=== Population ===
1959	1979	1989	2001	2016
5297	6319	7440	8006	7226

=== Language ===
Per 2001 census:

Ukrainian	Russian
94,92%	4,66%
