= Dachny (rural locality) =

Dachny (Russian: Да́чный; masculine), Dachnaya (Да́чная; feminine), or Dachnoye (Да́чное; neuter) is the name of several rural localities in Russia.

== Modern localities ==
- Dachny, Chelyabinsk Oblast, a settlement in Kosobrodsky Selsoviet of Troitsky District in Chelyabinsk Oblast
- Dachny, Kurgan Oblast, a settlement in Tagilsky Selsoviet of Kargapolsky District in Kurgan Oblast; 55°55′N 64°23′E
- Dachny, Lipetsk Oblast, a settlement in Bratovsky Selsoviet of Chaplyginsky District in Lipetsk Oblast; 53°22′N 40°2′E
- Dachny, Republic of Mordovia, a settlement in Dachny Selsoviet of Tengushevsky District in the Republic of Mordovia; 54°33′N 42°38′E
- Dachny, Novgorod Oblast, a settlement in Bolshevisherskoye Settlement of Malovishersky District in Novgorod Oblast
- Dachny, Omsk Oblast, a settlement in Nadezhdinsky Rural Okrug of Omsky District in Omsk Oblast; 55°15′N 73°21′E
- Dachny, Penza Oblast, a settlement in Plessky Selsoviet of Mokshansky District in Penza Oblast
- Dachny, Bagayevsky District, Rostov Oblast, a settlement in Bagayevskoye Rural Settlement of Bagayevsky District in Rostov Oblast; 47°15′N 40°26′E
- Dachny, Kagalnitsky District, Rostov Oblast, a khutor in Kirovskoye Rural Settlement of Kagalnitsky District in Rostov Oblast; 46°59′N 40°1′E
- Dachny, Tselinsky District, Rostov Oblast, a khutor in Sredneyegorlykskoye Rural Settlement of Tselinsky District in Rostov Oblast; 46°23′N 40°47′E
- Dachny, Sverdlovsk Oblast, a settlement in Dachny Selsoviet under the administrative jurisdiction of the City of Krasnouralsk in Sverdlovsk Oblast
- Dachny, Bologovsky District, Tver Oblast, a settlement in Ryutinskoye Rural Settlement of Bologovsky District in Tver Oblast
- Dachny, Zapadnodvinsky District, Tver Oblast, a settlement in Sharapovskoye Rural Settlement of Zapadnodvinsky District in Tver Oblast
- Dachnoye, Sudak, Republic of Crimea, a selo under the administrative jurisdiction of the town of republic significance of Sudak in the Republic of Crimea
- Dachnoye, Bakhchisaraysky District, Republic of Crimea, a selo in Bakhchisaraysky District of the Republic of Crimea
- Dachnoye, Ivanovo Oblast, a selo in Vichugsky District of Ivanovo Oblast
- Dachnoye, Chernyakhovsky District, Kaliningrad Oblast, a settlement in Kaluzhsky Rural Okrug of Chernyakhovsky District in Kaliningrad Oblast
- Dachnoye, Zelenogradsky District, Kaliningrad Oblast, a settlement in Kovrovsky Rural Okrug of Zelenogradsky District in Kaliningrad Oblast
- Dachnoye, Leningrad Oblast, a settlement under the administrative jurisdiction of Pavlovskoye Settlement Municipal Formation in Kirovsky District of Leningrad Oblast; 59°47′N 30°59′E
- Dachnoye, Republic of North Ossetia-Alania, a selo in Kurtatsky Rural Okrug of Prigorodny District in the Republic of North Ossetia-Alania; 43°5′N 44°44′E
- Dachnoye, Pskov Oblast, a settlement in Dnovsky District of Pskov Oblast
- Dachnoye, Sakhalin Oblast, a selo in Korsakovsky District of Sakhalin Oblast
- Dachnoye, Republic of Tatarstan, a settlement in Vysokogorsky District of the Republic of Tatarstan
- Dachnoye, Vologda Oblast, a village in Sukhonsky Selsoviet of Mezhdurechensky District in Vologda Oblast
- Dachnaya, Beloretsky District, Republic of Bashkortostan, a village in Sermenevsky Selsoviet of Beloretsky District in the Republic of Bashkortostan
- Dachnaya, Blagoveshchensky District, Republic of Bashkortostan, a village in Pokrovsky Selsoviet of Blagoveshchensky District in the Republic of Bashkortostan
- Dachnaya, Irkutsk Oblast, a settlement in Shelekhovsky District of Irkutsk Oblast

== Alternative names ==
- Dachny, alternative name of Sadovy, a settlement in Nachalovsky Selsoviet of Privolzhsky District in Astrakhan Oblast; 46°19′N 48°8′E
