= Makoshyne =

Rural locality in Chernihiv Oblast, Ukraine

Makoshyne Макошине
- Rural settlement
- Location within Chernihiv Oblast Location within Ukraine
- Coordinates: 51°27′43″N 32°20′23″E
- Country: Ukraine
- Oblast: Chernihiv Oblast
- Raion: Koriukivka Raion

Population (2022)
  - Total: 2,081
- Time zone: UTC+2 (EET)
  - Summer (DST): UTC+3 (EEST)

Makoshyne (Ukrainian: Макошине) is a rural settlement in Koriukivka Raion, Chernihiv Oblast, northern Ukraine. Makoshyne is located on the right bank of the Desna. It belongs to Mena urban hromada, one of the hromadas of Ukraine. Population: 2,081 (2022 estimate).

== History ==
Until 18 July 2020, Makoshyne belonged to Mena Raion. The raion was abolished in July 2020 as part of the administrative reform of Ukraine, which reduced the number of raions of Chernihiv Oblast to five. The area of Mena Raion was split between Chernihiv and Koriukivka Raions, with Makoshyne being transferred to Chernihiv Raion.

Until 26 January 2024, Makoshyne was designated urban-type settlement. On this day, a new law entered into force which abolished this status, and Makoshyne became a rural settlement.

== Geography ==
Makoshyne is located in the north of the Mena urban hromada, on the right bank of the Desna River (Dnieper basin). The territory of the Makoshyne is located within the Dnieper Lowland. The relief of the surface of the district is a lowland.

The climate of Makoshyne is moderately continental, with warm summers and relatively mild winters. The average temperature in January is about -7 °C, and in July ― +19 °C. The average annual precipitation ranges from 550 to 660 mm, with the highest precipitation in the summer period.

The most common are sod-podzolic and gray forest soils. The Makoshyne is located in the natural zone of mixed forests, in Polissya. Minerals – loam, peat, sand.

== Economy ==
=== Transportation ===
Makoshyne is connected by road with Mena, where it has access to Highway H27, connecting Chernihiv and Novhorod-Siverskyi. There is no road bridge over the Desna, and thus no roads in the southern direction from Makoshyne.

Makoshyne is a railway station on the line connecting Bakhmach with Mena, Snovsk, and Gomel. Since the start of the Russian invasion of Ukraine in 2022, train traffic on the railway bridge has been suspended.
