= Berezna =

Rural locality in Chernihiv Oblast, Ukraine

Berezna Березна
- Rural settlement
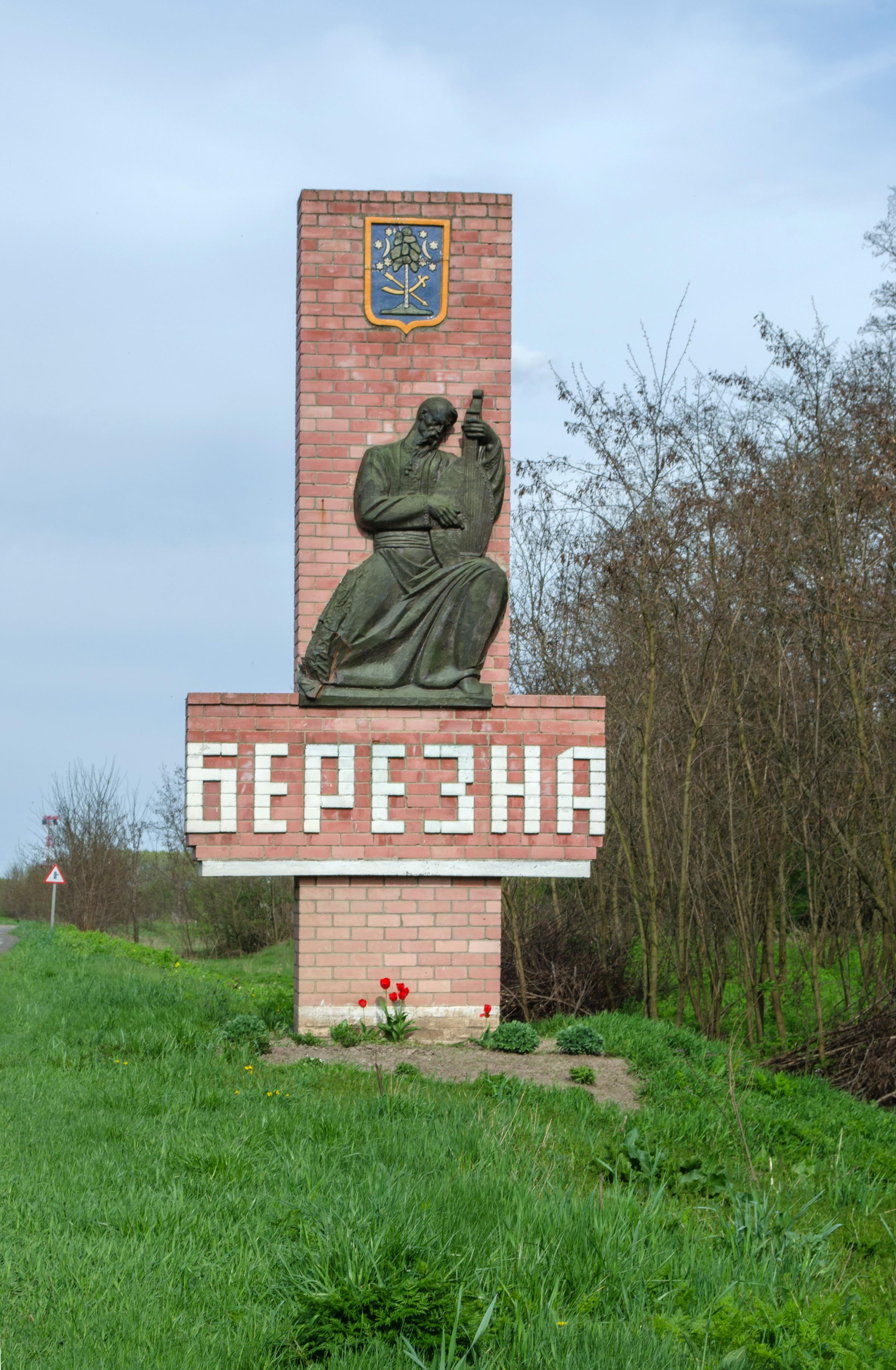

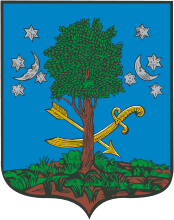
- Coat of arms

- Location within Chernihiv Oblast Location within Ukraine
- Coordinates: 51°34′26″N 31°47′06″E
- Country: Ukraine
- Oblast: Chernihiv Oblast
- Raion: Chernihiv Raion
- First Mentioned: 1152

Area
  - Total: 11.377 km^{2} (4.393 sq mi)

Population (2022)
  - Total: 4,338
  - Density: 381.3/km^{2} (987.6/sq mi)
- Time zone: UTC+2 (EET)
  - Summer (DST): UTC+3 (EEST)

Berezna (Ukrainian: Березна; Russian: Бере́зна) is a rural settlement in Chernihiv Raion, Chernihiv Oblast, northern Ukraine. It hosts the administration of Berezna settlement hromada, one of the hromadas of Ukraine. The territory of the Berezna is located within the Dnieper Lowland, belong to the Dnieper basin. Population: 4,338 (2022 estimate).

== History ==
Berezna was first mentioned in mid-12th century. Before the First World War the settlement was known as a centre of shoemaking, with over 1000 local craftsmen being employed in that profession. There was also a brick factory. In 1932 Berezna's population reached 11,000.

Until 18 July 2020, Berezna belonged to Mena Raion. The raion was abolished in July 2020 as part of the administrative reform of Ukraine, which reduced the number of raions of Chernihiv Oblast to five. The area of Mena Raion was split between Chernihiv and Koriukivka Raions, with Berezna being transferred to Chernihiv Raion.

Until 26 January 2024, Berezna was designated urban-type settlement. On this day, a new law entered into force which abolished this status, and Berezna became a rural settlement.

== Geography ==
The Berezna is located in the east of Chernihiv raion, 35 km from Chernihiv. The territory of the Berezna is located within the Dnieper Lowland, belong to the Dnieper basin. Berezna is located on the banks of the Krasilovka River, a right tributary of the Desna. The relief of the surface of the district is a lowland, slightly undulating plain, sometimes dissected by river valleys.

The climate of Berezna is moderately continental, with warm summers and relatively mild winters. The average temperature in January is about −7 °C, and in July - +19 °C. The average annual precipitation ranges from 550 to 660 mm, with the highest precipitation in the summer period.

The most common are sod-podzolic and gray forest soils. The Berezna is located in the natural zone of mixed forests, in Polissya. The main species in the forests are pine, oak, alder, ash, birch. Minerals – loam, peat, sand, brown coal.

== Economy ==
=== Transportation ===
Berezna is on Highway H27, connecting Chernihiv and Novhorod-Siverskyi. A road branches off north to Snovsk with further access to Koriukivka and Horodnia.

The closest railway station is located in the city of Chernihiv.

== Notable people ==
- Hryhoriy Veryovka, Ukrainian composer
