= Dachne, Chernihiv Oblast =

Village in Chernihiv Oblast, Ukraine

Dachne Дачне
- Location of Dachne Dachne (Ukraine)
- Coordinates: 51°53′03″N 32°46′57″E
- Country: Ukraine
- Oblast: Chernihiv Oblast
- Raion: Koriukivka Raion
- Elevation: 169 m (554 ft)

Population (2001)
  - Total: 187
- Postal code: 15333
- Area code: +380 4657
- Climate: Cfa

Dachne (Ukrainian: Дачне) is a village in Kholmy settlement hromada Koriukivka Raion, Chernihiv Oblast (province) of Ukraine. Dachne is located on the banks of the Ubid river, within the Dnieper Lowland, in Polissya.

== History ==
On June 12, 2020, in accordance with the order of the Cabinet of Ministers of Ukraine No. 730-r “On the determination of administrative centers and approval of the territories of territorial communities of Chernihiv region”, Dachne became part of the Kholmyn settlement community.

On July 19, 2020, as a result of the administrative-territorial reform and the liquidation of the Koryukiv district, the village became part of the newly formed Koryukiv district of Chernihiv region.

== Geography ==
Dachne is located on the banks of the Ubid river ( Desna basin), 76 km (47 mi) from Koriukivka and Koriukivka railway station and 50 km (31 mi) from Kozylivka.

Dachne is located in the northeast part of Chernihiv Oblast and in the center part of Koryukivskyi raion. The territory of the village is located within the Dnieper Lowland. The climate of Dachne is moderately continental, with warm summers and relatively mild winters. The average temperature in January is about -7 °C, and in July - +19 °C. The average annual precipitation ranges from 550 to 660 mm, with the highest precipitation in the summer period.The most common are sod-podzolic and gray forest soils. The Dachne is located in the natural zone of mixed forests, in Polissya.

== Transportation ==
The village is served by a district-level road network. There is no rail village. The nearest railway station is located in Koriukivka .
