= Okhramiievychi =

- Охрамі́євичі
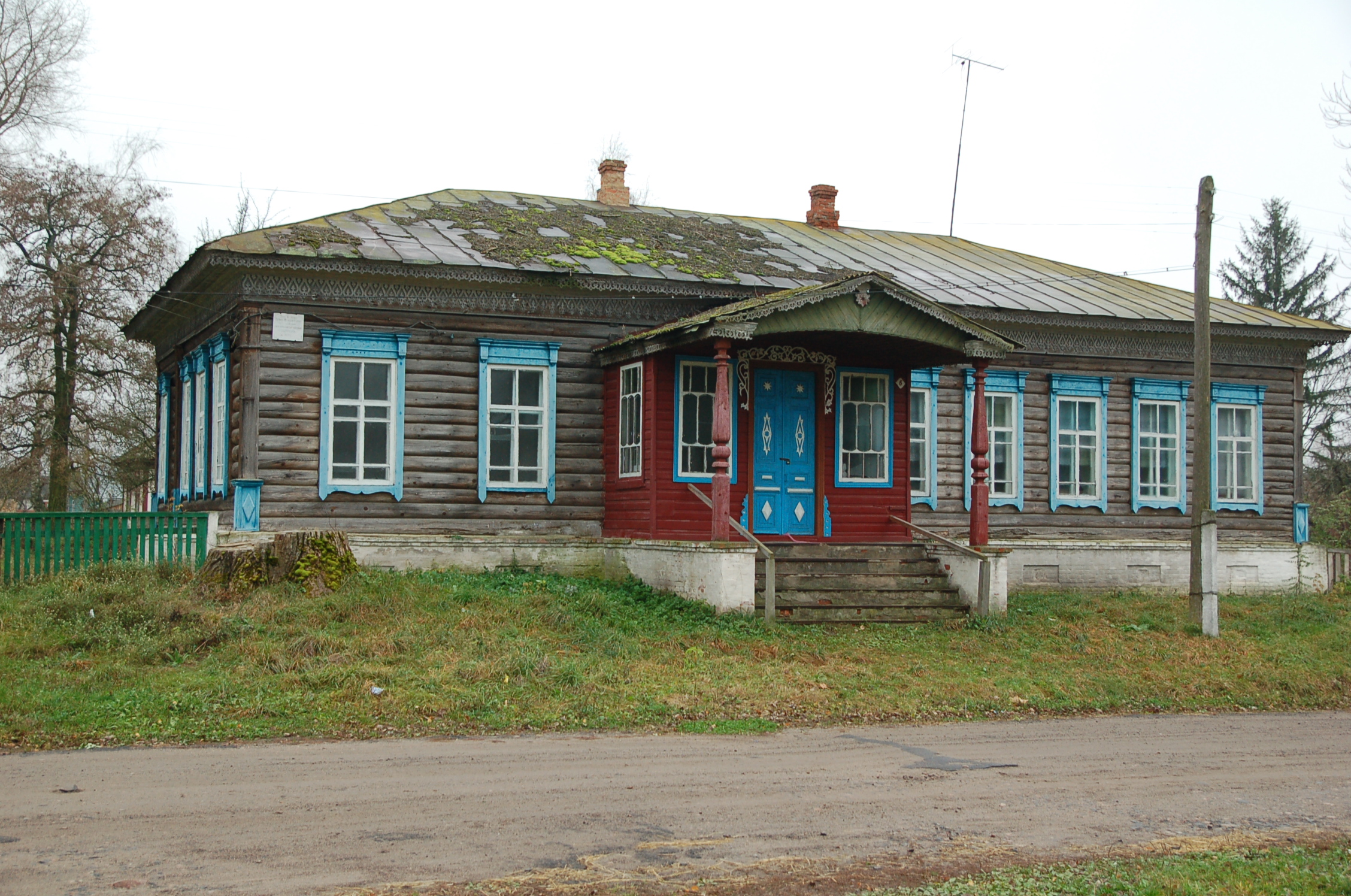

- Location within Chernihiv Oblast Location within Ukraine
- Country: Ukraine
- Oblast: Chernihiv Oblast
- Raion: Koriukivka Raion

Area
  - Total: 382 km^{2} (147 sq mi)

Population
  - Total: 448

Okhramiievychi (Ukrainian: Охрамі́євичі) is a village in northern Ukraine, in Koriukivka Raion, Chernihiv Oblast. It is located in Koriukivka urban hromada, one of the hromadas of Ukraine. It has a population of 448 people. Okhramiievychi is located on the banks of the Snov river, within the Dnieper Lowland, in Polissya.

== History ==
The village was founded in the first half of the 16th century.

On June 12, 2020, in accordance with the order of the Cabinet of Ministers of Ukraine No. 730-r “On the determination of administrative centers and approval of the territories of territorial communities of Chernihiv region”, Okhramiievychi became part of the Kholmyn settlement community.

On 19 July 2020, in accordance with administrative reforms across Ukraine, Okhramiievychi became part of Koriukivka urban hromada.

== Geography ==
The total area of the Okhramiievychi is 382 km^{2} . Okhramiievychi is located 21 km from the district center, on the left bank of the Snov river ( Desna basin), in the north part of Chernihiv Oblast. The territory of the village is located within the Dnieper Lowland. The climate of Okhramiievychi is moderately continental, with warm summers and relatively mild winters. The average temperature in January is about -7 °C, and in July - +19 °C. The average annual precipitation ranges from 550 to 660 mm, with the highest precipitation in the summer period.The most common are sod-podzolic and gray forest soils. The Okhramiievychi is located in the natural zone of mixed forests, in Polissya.

== Transportation ==
The village is served by a district-level road network. There is no rail village. The nearest railway station is located in Koriukivka .

== Notable people ==
- Volodymyr Ivanovych Barvinok (1879—1943), Ukrainian historian
