= Assadulayevo =

Assadulayevo Ассадулаево
- Settlement
- Location within Astrakhan Oblast Location within Russia
- Coordinates: 46°14′N 47°56′E
- Country: Russia
- Region: Astrakhan Oblast
- District: Privolzhsky District
- Time zone: UTC+4:00

Assadulayevo (Russian: Ассадулаево) is a rural locality (a settlement) in Tatarobashmakovsky Selsoviet, Privolzhsky District, Astrakhan Oblast, Russia. The population was 843 as of 2010. There are 23 streets.

== Geography ==
Assadulayevo is located 34 km southwest of Nachalovo (the district's administrative centre) by road. Tatarskaya Bashmakovka is the nearest rural locality.
