= Dachne =

Dachne is a place name in Ukraine which can refer to the following villages:

- Dachne, Bakhchisaray Raion, Crimea
- Dachne, Sudak Municipality, Crimea
- Dachne, Volyn Oblast
- Dachne, Shyroke hromada, Kryvyi Rih Raion, Dnipropetrovsk Oblast
- Dachne, Vakulivska hromada, Kryvyi Rih Raion, Dnipropetrovsk Oblast
- Dachne, Pavlohrad Raion, Dnipropetrovsk Oblast
- Dachne, Dubovyky hromada, Synelnykove Raion, Dnipropetrovsk Oblast
- Dachne, Novopavlivka hromada, Synelnykove Raion, Dnipropetrovsk Oblast
- Dachne, Bakhmut Raion, Donetsk Oblast
- Dachne, Pokrovsk Raion, Donetsk Oblast
- Dachne, Svatove Raion, Luhansk Oblast
- Dachne, Slovianoserbsk Raion, Luhansk Oblast
- Dachne, Odesa Oblast
- Dachne, Kharkiv Oblast
- Dachne, Chernihiv Oblast

== See also ==
- Dachny (disambiguation)
