= Karagali =

Karagali Карагали
- Selo
- Location within Astrakhan Oblast Location within Russia
- Coordinates: 46°15′N 47°59′E
- Country: Russia
- Region: Astrakhan Oblast
- District: Privolzhsky District
- Time zone: UTC+4:00

Karagali (Russian: Карагали, Nogai: Каргалык) is a rural locality (a selo) in Privolzhsky District, Astrakhan Oblast, Russia. The population was 2,734 as of 2017. There are 136 streets.

== Name ==
The official Russian name of the village, Karagali, is a phonetic adaptation of Каргалык (Qarğalıq, 'place with many crows'), the original name used by its predominantly Nogai and Tatar residents. A welcome sign installed by Karagali residents by the road connecting Astrakhan to Kamyzyak displays both names of the village.

== Geography ==
Karagali is located 28 km southwest of Nachalovo (the district's administrative centre) by road. Tatarskaya Bashmakovka is the nearest rural locality.
