= Poymenny =

Poymenny Пойменный
- Settlement
- Location within Astrakhan Oblast Location within Russia
- Coordinates: 46°27′N 48°11′E
- Country: Russia
- Region: Astrakhan Oblast
- District: Privolzhsky District
- Time zone: UTC+4:00

Poymenny (Russian: Пойменный) is a rural locality (a settlement) in Novorychinsky Selsoviet, Privolzhsky District, Astrakhan Oblast, Russia. The population was 1,299 as of 2010. There are 28 streets.

== Geography ==
Poymenny is located 22 km north of Nachalovo (the district's administrative centre) by road. Bely Ilmen is the nearest rural locality.
