= Yaksatovo =

Yaksatovo Яксатово
- Selo
- Location within Astrakhan Oblast Location within Russia
- Coordinates: 46°14′N 48°00′E
- Country: Russia
- Region: Astrakhan Oblast
- District: Privolzhsky District
- Time zone: UTC+4:00

Yaksatovo (Russian: Яксатово, Tatar: Майлыгүл) is a rural locality (a selo) and the administrative center of Yaksatovsky Selsoviet, Privolzhsky District, Astrakhan Oblast, Russia. The population was 3,576 as of 2010. There are 80 streets.

== Geography ==
Yaksatovo is located 31 km southwest of Nachalovo (the district's administrative centre) by road. Karagali is the nearest rural locality.
