= Vodyanovka =

Vodyanovka Водяновка
- Selo
- Location within Astrakhan Oblast Location within Russia
- Coordinates: 46°14′N 48°10′E
- Country: Russia
- Region: Astrakhan Oblast
- District: Privolzhsky District
- Time zone: UTC+4:00

Vodyanovka (Russian: Водяновка) is a rural locality (a selo) in Yevpraksinsky Selsoviet, Privolzhsky District, Astrakhan Oblast, Russia. The population was 797 as of 2010. There are 24 streets.

== Geography ==
Vodyanovka is located 28 km south of Nachalovo (the district's administrative centre) by road. Yevpraksino is the nearest rural locality.
