= Kirpichnogo zavoda 1 =

Settlement in Astrakhan Oblast, Russia

Kirpichnogo zavoda 1 Кирпичного завода № 1
- Settlement
- Location within Astrakhan Oblast Location within Russia
- Coordinates: 46°15′N 48°04′E
- Country: Russia
- Region: Astrakhan Oblast
- District: Privolzhsky District
- Time zone: UTC+4:00

Kirpichnogo zavoda 1 (Russian: Кирпичного завода № 1) is a rural locality (a settlement) in Funtovsky Selsoviet, Privolzhsky District, Astrakhan Oblast, Russia. The population was 3,041 as of 2010. There are 138 streets.

== Geography ==
Kirpichnogo zavoda 1 is located on the Tsaryov River, 20 km southwest of Nachalovo (the district's administrative centre) by road. Funtovo-1 is the nearest rural locality.
