= Yevpraksino =

Rural locality in Astrakhan Oblast, Russia

Yevpraksino Евпраксино
- Selo
- Location within Astrakhan Oblast Location within Russia
- Coordinates: 46°14′N 48°11′E
- Country: Russia
- Region: Astrakhan Oblast
- District: Privolzhsky District
- Time zone: UTC+4:00

Yevpraksino (Russian: Евпраксино) is a rural locality (a selo) and the administrative center of Yevpraksinsky Selsoviet, Privolzhsky District, Astrakhan Oblast, Russia. The population was 1,379 as of 2010. There are 20 streets.

== Geography ==
Yevpraksino is located 29 km south of Nachalovo (the district's administrative centre) by road. Vodyanovka is the nearest rural locality.
