= Kizan, Astrakhan Oblast =

Kizan Кизань
- Settlement
- Location within Astrakhan Oblast Location within Russia
- Coordinates: 46°13′N 48°00′E
- Country: Russia
- Region: Astrakhan Oblast
- District: Privolzhsky District
- Time zone: UTC+4:00

Kizan (Russian: Кизань) is a rural locality (a settlement) in Tatarobashmakovsky Selsoviet, Privolzhsky District, Astrakhan Oblast, Russia. The population was 92 as of 2010. There are 3 streets.

== Geography ==
Kizan is located 34 km southwest of Nachalovo (the district's administrative centre) by road. Steklozavoda is the nearest rural locality.
