= Dachny =

Dachny (masculine), Dachnaya (feminine), or Dachnoye (neuter) may refer to:

- Dachny (rural locality) (Dachnaya, Dachnoye), several rural localities in Russia
- Dachnoye Municipal Okrug, a municipal okrug in Kirovsky District of the federal city of St. Petersburg, Russia
- Dachnoye metro station, a temporary station of the Leningrad Metropolitan in service between 1966 and 1977
- Dachne (disambiguation) (Dachnoye), several inhabited localities in Ukraine
