= Kholmy, Chernihiv Oblast =

Rural locality in Chernihiv Oblast, Ukraine

Kholmy Холми
- Rural settlement
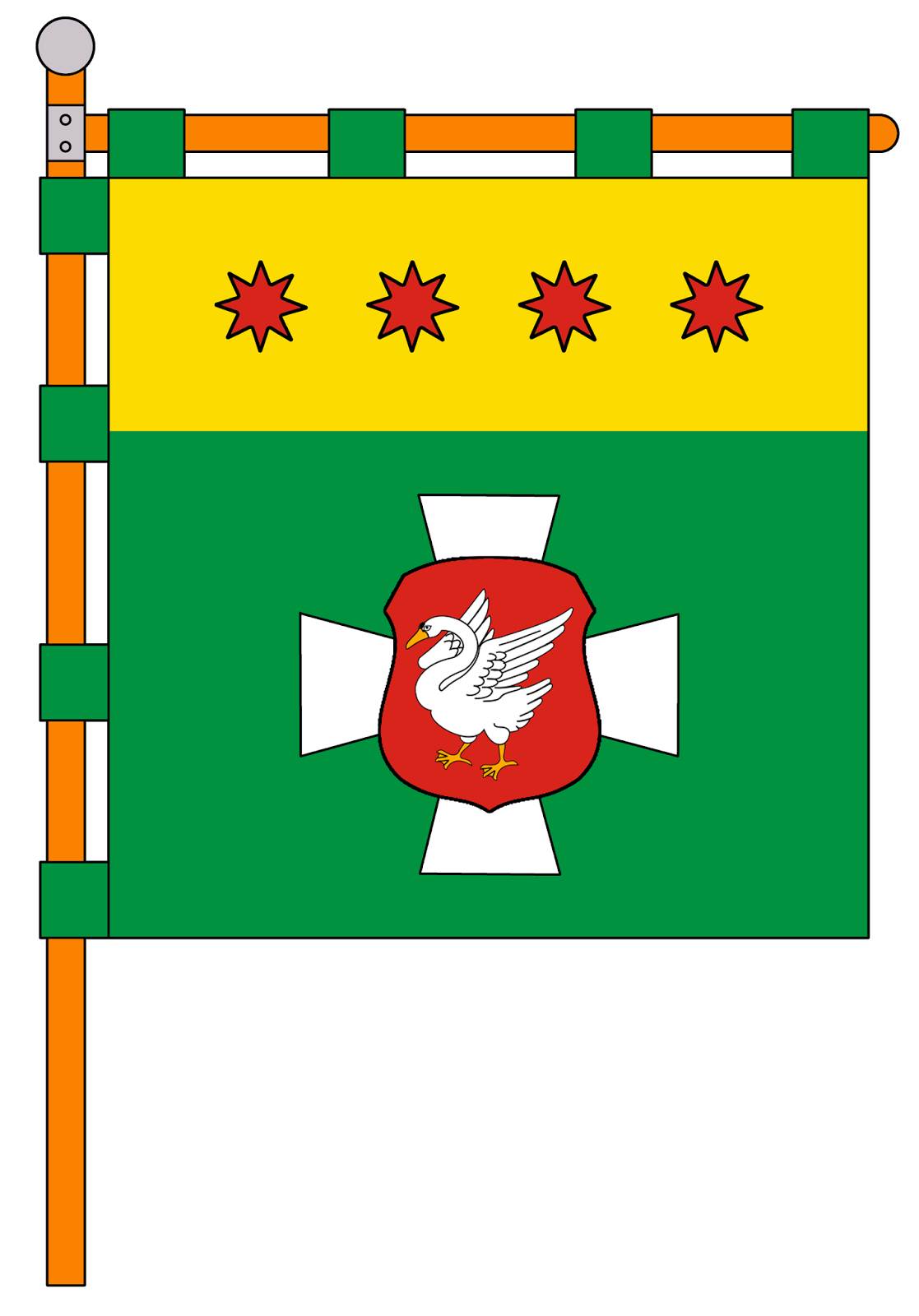
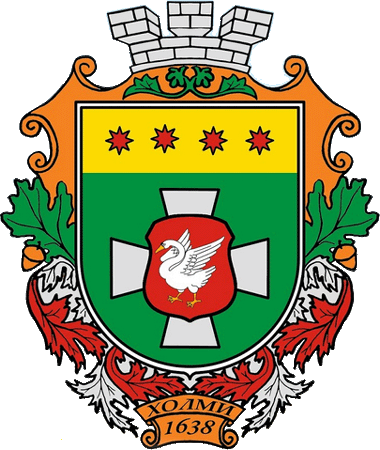
- Flag Coat of arms

- Location within Chernihiv Oblast Location within Ukraine
- Country: Ukraine
- Oblast: Chernihiv Oblast
- Raion: Koriukivka Raion

Population (2022)
  - Total: 2,459
- Postal code: 15331
- Area code: + 4657
- Website: None

Kholmy (Ukrainian: Холми) is a rural settlement in Koriukivka Raion, Chernihiv Oblast, northern Ukraine. It hosts the administration of Kholmy settlement hromada, one of the hromadas of Ukraine. Population: 2,459 (2022 estimate).

Kholmy produces alcohol, bricks, dairy products, timber, and has a museum.

== History ==
=== Independent Ukraine ===
Until 26 January 2024, Kholmy was designated urban-type settlement. On this day, a new law entered into force which abolished this status, and Kholmy became a rural settlement.

== Geography ==
The settlement is on the right bank (facing south) of the Ubed, is 35 kilometres (22 mi) from the district center.

The territory of the Kholmy is located within the Dnieper Lowland. The relief of the surface of the district is a lowland, slightly undulating plain, sometimes dissected by river valleys. All rivers belong to the Dnieper basin. The Ubid River, a left tributary of the Desna, flows through the settlement.

The climate of Kholmy is moderately continental, with warm summers and relatively mild winters. The average temperature in January is about -7 °C, and in July - +19 °C. The average annual precipitation ranges from 550 to 660 mm, with the highest precipitation in the summer period.

The most common are sod-podzolic and gray forest soils. The Kholmy is located in the natural zone of mixed forests, in Polissya. Minerals – loam, peat, sand.

== Economy ==
The hromadas agriculture specializes in growing grain, oilseed and industrial crops, and producing livestock products - milk, meat, eggs. The raion has a developed woodworking industry and food industry. Processing is developed: production of sugar and alcohol.

=== Transportation ===
Regional highways in the direction of Chernihiv-Kholm-Semenivka pass through the Kholm settlement community. There is no railway connection. The nearest railway station is located in Koriukivka (South-Western Railway).
