= Sosnytsia Raion =

Former subdivision of Chernihiv Oblast, Ukraine

Sosnytsia Raion Сосницький район
- Raion
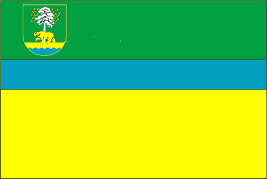
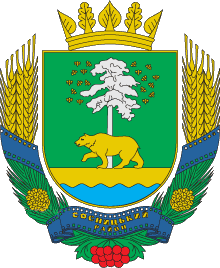
- Flag Coat of arms

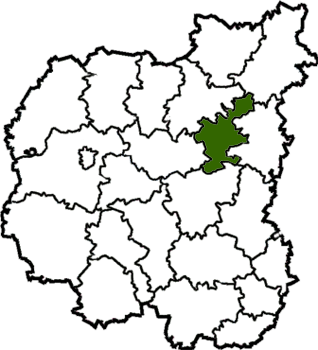
- Raion location in Chernihiv Oblast
- Coordinates: 51°37′8″N 32°35′33″E
- Country: Ukraine
- Oblast: Chernihiv Oblast
- Disestablished: 18 July 2020
- Admin. center: Sosnytsia

Area
  - Total: 916 km^{2} (354 sq mi)

Population (2020)
  - Total: 17,377
  - Density: 19.0/km^{2} (49.1/sq mi)
- Time zone: UTC+2 (EET)
  - Summer (DST): UTC+3 (EEST)
- Website: http://sosadm.cg.gov.ua/

Sosnytsia Raion (Ukrainian: Сосницький район) was a raion (district) of Chernihiv Oblast, northern Ukraine. Its administrative centre was located at the urban-type settlement of Sosnytsia. The raion was abolished on 18 July 2020 as part of the administrative reform of Ukraine, which reduced the number of raions of Chernihiv Oblast to five. The area of Sosnytsia Raion was merged into Koriukivka Raion. The last estimate of the raion population was 17,377 (2020 est.)

At the time of disestablishment, the raion consisted of one hromada, Sosnytsia settlement hromada with the administration in Sosnytsia.
