= Snovsk Raion =

Former subdivision of Chernihiv Oblast, Ukraine

Snovsk Raion Сновський район
- Raion
- Flag Coat of arms

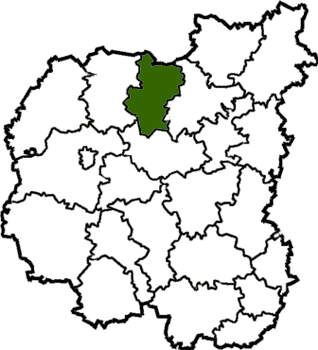
- Raion location in Chernihiv Oblast
- Coordinates: 51°52′8″N 31°55′56″E
- Country: Ukraine
- Oblast: Chernihiv Oblast
- Disestablished: 18 July 2020
- Admin. center: Snovsk

Area
  - Total: 1,283 km^{2} (495 sq mi)

Population (2020)
  - Total: 22,405
  - Density: 17.46/km^{2} (45.23/sq mi)
- Time zone: UTC+2 (EET)
  - Summer (DST): UTC+3 (EEST)
- Website: http://schorsadm.cg.gov.ua/

Snovsk Raion (Ukrainian: Сновський район), until May 2016 Shchors Raion (Ukrainian: Щорський район), was a raion (district) of Chernihiv Oblast, northern Ukraine. Its administrative centre was located at the town of Snovsk. The raion was abolished on 18 July 2020 as part of the administrative reform of Ukraine, which reduced the number of raions of Chernihiv Oblast to five. The area of Snovsk Raion was merged into Koriukivka Raion The last estimate of the raion population was 22,405 (2020 est.)

On 21 May 2016, Verkhovna Rada adopted decision to rename Shchors Raion to Snovsk Raion and Shchors to Snovsk according to the law prohibiting names of Communist origin.

At the time of disestablishment, the raion consisted of one hromada, Snovsk urban hromada with the administration in Snovsk.
