= Koriukivka massacre =

Mass murder of Ukrainians by Nazi Germany

Koriukivka Massacre
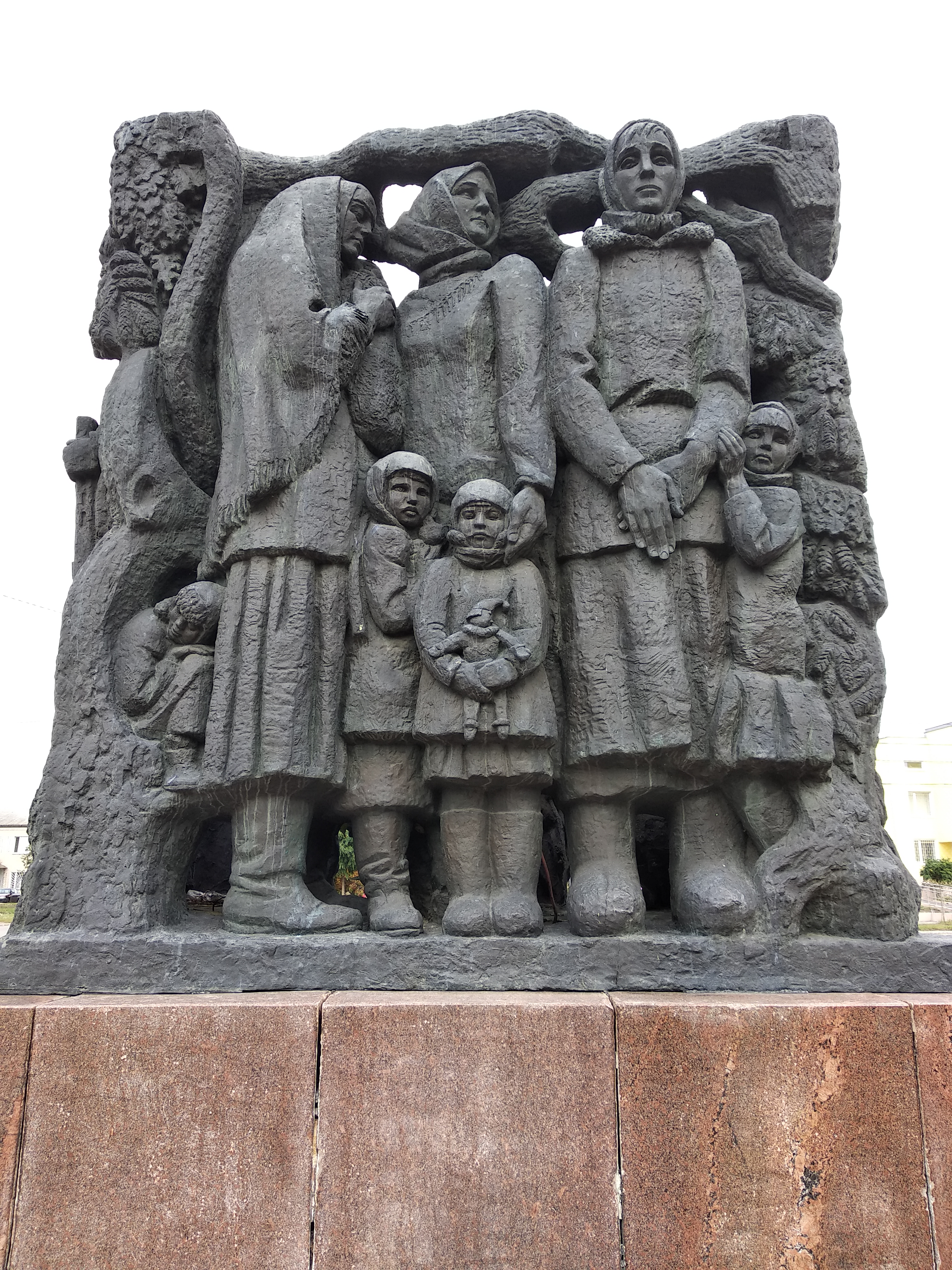
- Monument in Koriukivka memorializing the victims of Nazi violence
- Location: Koriukivka, Army Group South Rear Area
- Date: 1–2 March 1943
- Target: Ukrainians
- Attack type: Genocidal massacre
- Weapon: Firearms
- Deaths: 6,700–7,000 civilians
- Perpetrators: Nazi Germany; Kingdom of Hungary

The Koriukivka massacre was a war crime against 6,700–7,000 residents of Koriukivka, Soviet Ukraine on 1–2 March 1943 by the SS forces of Nazi Germany and the 105th Light Division of the Royal Hungarian Army. 1290 houses in Koriukivka were burned down and only ten brick buildings and a church survived. The residents of neighboring localities were intimidated and refused to help the Koriukivka residents. On 9 March, the Germans returned to Koriukivka and burned alive some elderly people who had returned to the village after escaping thinking it was safe.

According to forensic evidence, the deaths were brought on particularly by shootings from automatic weapons such as submachine guns and light machine guns also blows with blunt objects and burning. Some people were burned alive. The mass murder was committed as a retribution for Soviet partisan activities headed by Oleksiy Fedorov. Koriukivka was liberated by Soviet troops on 19 March 1943. A report on the number of victims and inflicted damage was compiled in the same year. The Koriukivka massacre was the largest German punitive operation against civilians in World War II.

== Background ==
Before the beginning of the German-Soviet War, Koriukivka had a population of approximately 10,000 inhabitants, most of whom worked at the local sugar refinery. In September 1941 the town was occupied by Nazis, installing a new local government and establishing a police force. Nazis and their Hungarian allies started a campaign of extermination against Jews, Roma people and those suspected of opposing their rule.

During the German occupation, the town of Koriukivka was a center of Soviet partisan warfare in Chernihiv Oblast, because the area's forested landscape contributed to guerrilla activities. Local partisans established a single command led by Oleksiy Fedorov, who coordinated his units' operations with Moscow. The partisans organized intelligence, sabotage attacks and killings of collaborationists. As a response to partisan attacks, occupying forces engaged in collective punishment of locals, which included mass murders of civilians and burning of entire villages.

After Fedorov's partisans learned that two underage sons of the commander of a local Soviet partisan unit in a nearby village had been jailed in the Koriukivka prison, they attempted to liberate them. On the night of 27 February 1943, the partisans attacked the Axis garrison stationed in the town, which consisted mostly of Hungarians. During that raid, 78 Axis soldiers were claimed to have been killed and eight captured. The inmates were liberated, and the partisan headquarters reported the capture of two machine guns, 119 rifles and 2500 cartridges, and five occupiers. Several prisoners were released, and some buildings blown up. The partisans had warned the residents of Koriukivka about possible German retribution, but the next day after the partisan raid the way out was blocked. Nonetheless, at least one woman with three children managed to escape from Koriukivka on that day.

There are different explanations for the motivation behind the partisan attack on Koriukivka. Some researchers claim that Mykola Popudrenko, who managed the operation, aimed to demonstrate success before his command in Moscow in order to receive more support. Others believe, that the attack was planned in order to complicate the relations between Nazi occupiers and locals, with an aim to mobilize the latter into the rows of partisans.

== The massacre ==
On the morning of 1 March 1943 an SS unit arrived to Koriukivka from Shchors and sealed off the town. Initially, the Germans tried to huddle all residents in the village's center. When some residents, anticipating the forthcoming killings, had tried to escape, the Germans started to enter all houses, shooting down every occupant. Those who were huddled in the village's centre were shot down in the village's largest buildings, the restaurant and the theater. In the restaurant, about 500 people were killed. Five of the civilians huddled at the restaurant managed to survive. An order was issued to shoot down all Koriukivka residents who had escaped to neighboring settlements.

The punitive squad received an order to raze the whole town of Koriukivka, but their actions also damaged the nearby settlement of Oleksiivka. At the same time, a number of peripherial areas of Koriukivka were not attacked, probably due to the perpetrators mistakenly believing them to be separate settlements.

Despite the presence of a large number of Soviet partisans in the area of Koriukivka during the massacre, their forces didn't intervene to stop the murders of civilians. One cause for this was the numerical superiority of occupiers, while another factor was the planned partisan raid to Volhynia, preparations for which forced the partisans to spare their manpower and ammunition. According to witnesses presented by former partisans themselves, many fighters were eager to defend the town, but were prevented from doing it by their command.

== Perpetrators ==
According to historian Dmytro Vedeneyev, the massacre was committed by SS and collaborationist auxiliary police. The number of perpetrators of the massacre is estimated at 300–500.

According to the documents released from Russian archives on request of the Ukrainian Institute of National Memory in 2011, the perpetrators of the massacre were the soldiers of the Hungarian 105 light infantry division under command of general-lieutenant Zoltan Algya-Pap, in cooperation with a Schutzmannschaft bataillon of local collaborators. In 1947, Algya-Pap was tried for his crimes and sentenced to labor camps. The order was issued by Lt Col. Bruno Franz Bayer, the commandant of the 399th field commandant's office (Konotop District) in the occupied territory.

== Victims ==
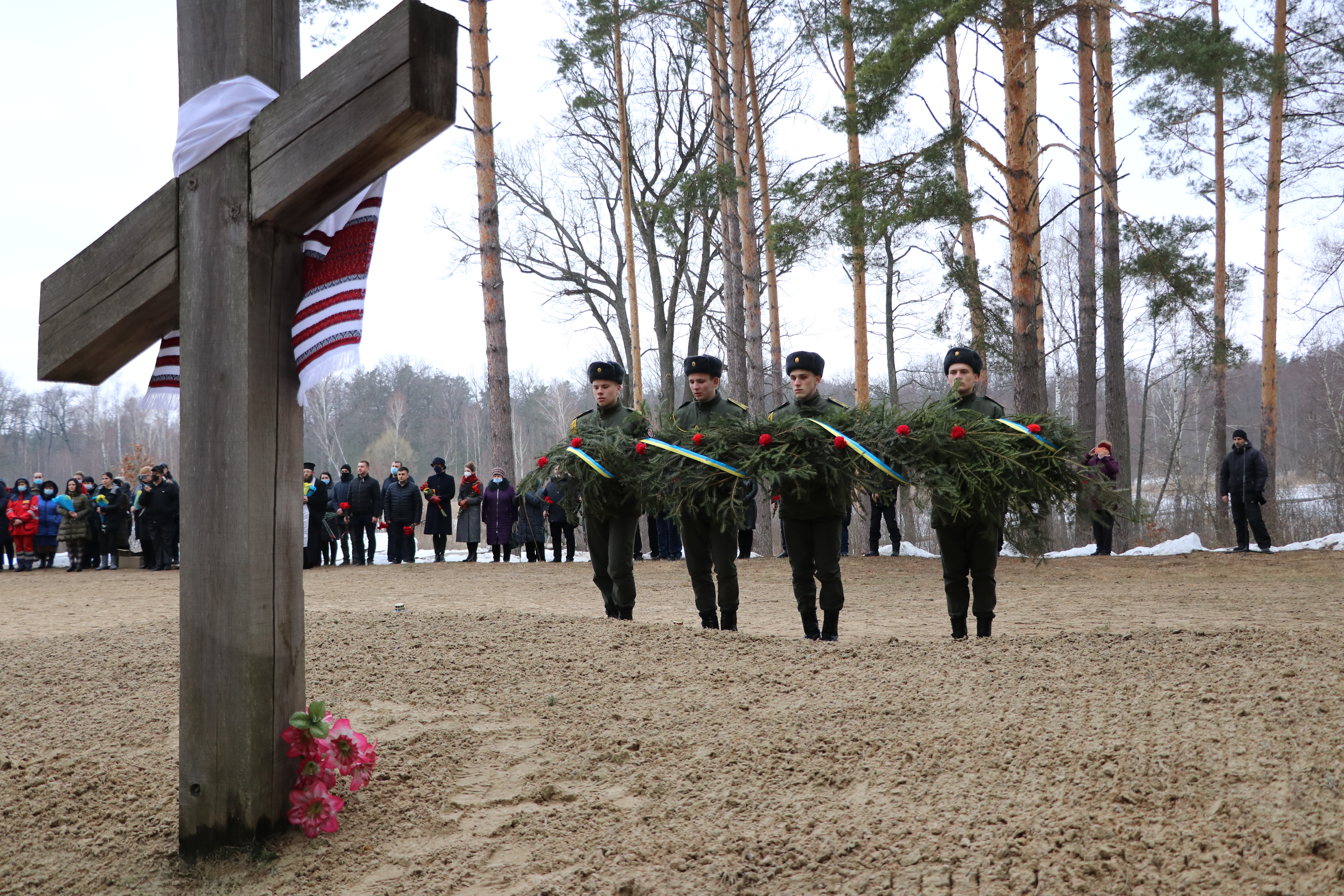
Commemoration of the massacre's victims at the site of the memorial cemetery near Koriukivka

In total, 6,700-7,000 inhabitants of Koriukivka were killed by Nazis on 1, 3 and 9 March, and 1290 houses in the town were destroyed. 5,612 victims of the massacre remain unidentified.

== Remembrance ==
The massacre of Koriukivka started achieving broad publicity only during the 1960s, and before that had been mostly known to locals. It was overshadowed by the Khatyn massacre, which, despite resulting in almost 50 times fewer vicims, became the main symbol of Nazi war crimes in Soviet propaganda. In 1977 a monument to the massacre's victims was installed on the location of the restaurant in the town centre, where almost 500 people had been burned in 1943. Starting from 2011, the construction of a memorial cemetery on the outskirts of Koriukivka has been ongoing, but its completion has been postponed due to the Russian invasion of Ukraine.

== See also ==
- Hungarian war crimes in World War II
- German war crimes in World War II
- Oradour-sur-Glane massacre
