= Sadovy, Astrakhan Oblast =

Sadovy Садовый
- Settlement
- Location within Astrakhan Oblast Location within Russia
- Coordinates: 48°28′N 45°33′E
- Country: Russia
- Region: Astrakhan Oblast
- District: Privolzhsky District
- Time zone: UTC+4:00

Sadovy (Russian: Садовый) is a rural locality (a settlement) in Nachalovsky Selsoviet, Privolzhsky District, Astrakhan Oblast, Russia. The population was 513 as of 2010. There is 1 street.

== Geography ==
Sadovy is located 6 km northwest of Nachalovo (the district's administrative centre) by road. Novonachalovsky is the nearest rural locality.
