= Andrii Grinenko =

Ukrainian entrepreneur and businessman

- Born: February 25, 1979 (age 47); Pereiaslav (Kyiv Oblast)
- Education: Kyiv National Economic University; Kyiv National Agrarian University
- Occupations: Entrepreneurship, energy sector, public activity
- Known for: development of autonomous and Renewable energy in Ukraine and Europe

Andrii Grinenko (born 25 February 1979) is a Ukrainian entrepreneur, Doctor of Economics, and energy specialist. He is co‑founder of the Clear Energy group of companies and founder of RSE s.r.o. (Czech Republic).

== Biography ==
Andrii Grinenko was born on 25 February 1979 in Pereiaslav, Kyiv Oblast. In 1996 he graduated with honors from Secondary School No. 1.

In 2000, he graduated with honors from Kyiv National Economic University (specialization: Finance and Credit). He also received additional education at Kyiv National Agrarian University (specialization: Accounting and Auditing).

In 2021 he defended his PhD thesis in the field of "Economic security of the state" and received the degree of Doctor of Economics.

== Professional activity ==
From 2000 to 2009 he worked in the financial and commercial sectors. From 2009 he joined the district state administrations of Kyiv Oblast, and in 2013 he was appointed Head of the Boryspil District Administration.

Since 2015 he has been co‑founder and CEO of the Clear Energy group, implementing large‑scale projects in bioenergy (biomass-fired CHP), solar and wind power generation, landfill gasification, and centralized heat supply. Notable projects include a wood-chip-fired CHP in Koriukivka (Chernihiv Oblast), central heating boilers in Zhytomyr, and 15 landfill gasification stations across Ukraine.

In 2023 he founded RSE s.r.o. (Czech Republic), specializing in autonomous energy solutions for communities, industrial enterprises, and critical infrastructure. The company produces cogeneration units from 400 kW to 4.5 MW, industrial heat pumps with propane turbo-compressors, and turnkey solutions ready for deployment in 7–10 days. In 2024 RSE delivered over 200 MW of equipment to 11 Ukrainian regions, with annual manufacturing capacities of 400 boilers and 480 cogeneration units, partnering with Farmak, MHP, Epicenter, Ukrzaliznytsia, Avangardco, UPG, KZS, and Vatsak, and aims to reach 700 MW of deliveries by the end of 2025.

== Family ==
Married with three children.
