= Mena Raion =

Former subdivision of Chernihiv Oblast, Ukraine

Mena Raion Менський район
- Raion
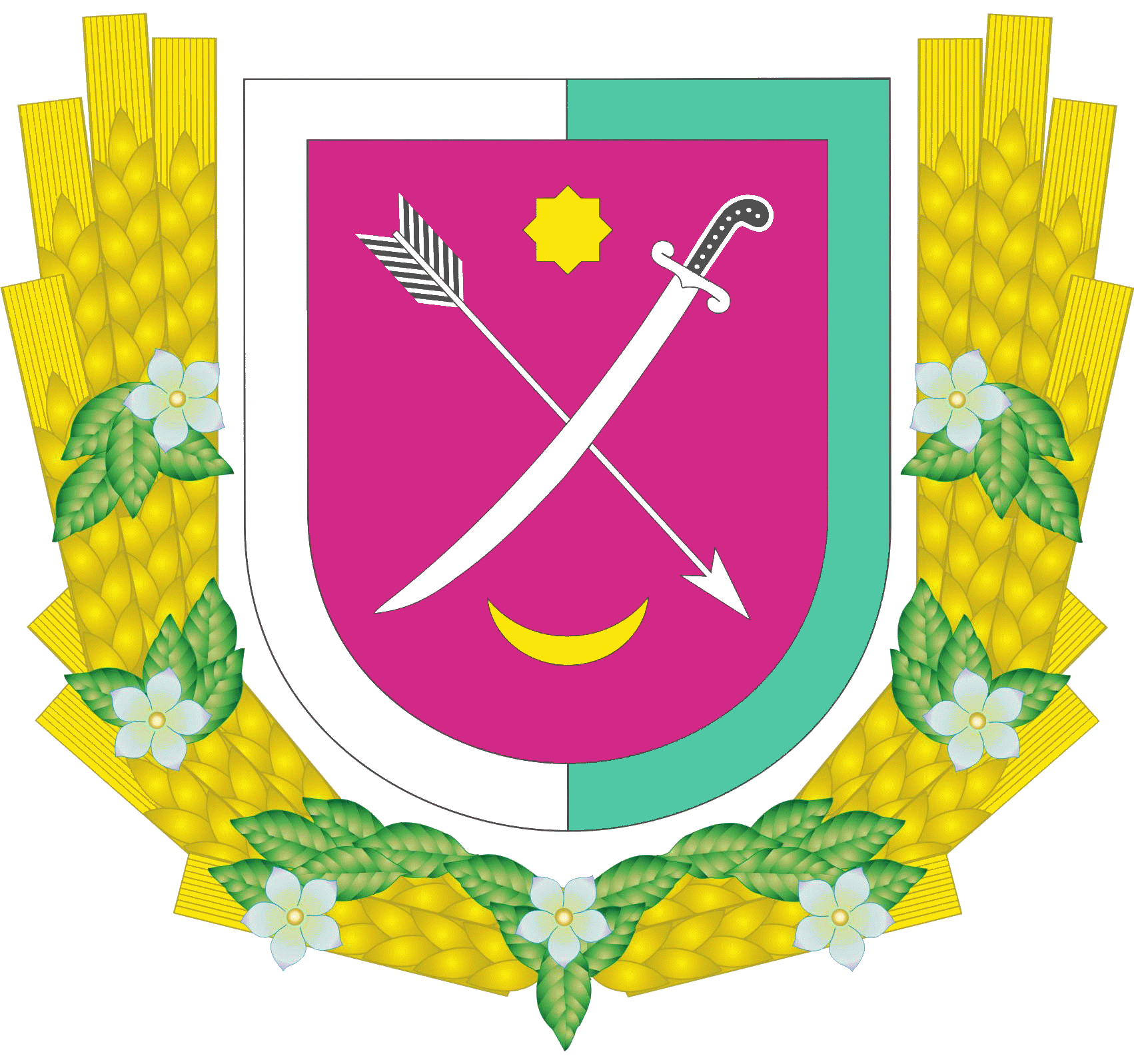
- Flag Coat of arms

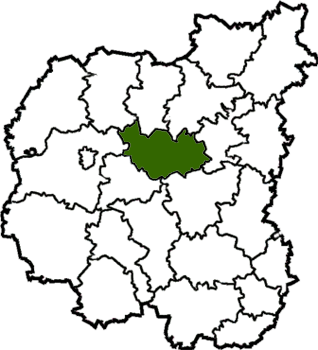
- Raion location in Chernihiv Oblast
- Coordinates: 51°31′17″N 32°1′18″E
- Country: Ukraine
- Oblast: Chernihiv Oblast
- Established: 1923
- Disestablished: 18 July 2020
- Admin. center: Mena

Area
  - Total: 1,376 km^{2} (531 sq mi)

Population (2020)
  - Total: 33,730
  - Density: 24.51/km^{2} (63.49/sq mi)
- Time zone: UTC+2 (EET)
  - Summer (DST): UTC+3 (EEST)
- Website: http://meadm.cg.gov.ua/

Mena Raion (Ukrainian: Менський район) was a raion (district) of Chernihiv Oblast, northern Ukraine. Its administrative centre was located at the city of Mena. The raion was abolished on 18 July 2020 as part of the administrative reform of Ukraine, which reduced the number of raions of Chernihiv Oblast to five. The area of Mena Raion was split between Chernihiv and Koriukivka Raions. The last estimate of the raion population was 33,730 (2020 est.)

At the time of disestablishment, the raion consisted of two hromadas:

- Berezna settlement hromada with the administration in the urban-type settlement of Berezna, transferred to Chernihiv Raion;
- Mena urban hromada with the administration in Mena, transferred to Koriukivka Raion.
