= Sosnytsia =

Rural locality in Chernihiv Oblast, Ukraine

Sosnytsia Сocниця
- Rural settlement
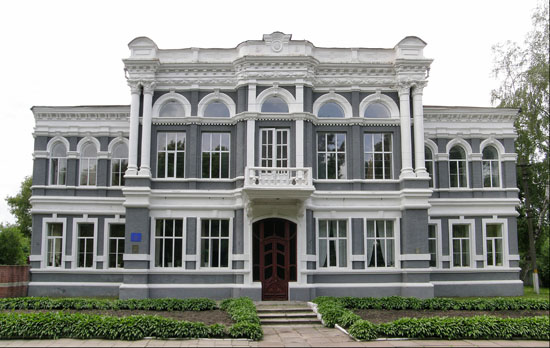

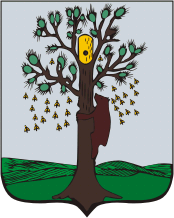
- Coat of arms

- Location of Sosnytsia Sosnytsia (Ukraine)
- Coordinates: 51°31′52″N 32°29′59″E
- Country: Ukraine
- Oblast: Chernihiv Oblast
- Raion: Koriukivka Raion
- Hromada: Sosnytsia settlement hromada

Area
  - Total: 8.97 km^{2} (3.46 sq mi)

Population (2022)
  - Total: 6,589
  - Density: 735/km^{2} (1,900/sq mi)
- Postal code: 16100
- Area code: +380 4655

Sosnytsia (Ukrainian: Сocниця) is a rural settlement in Koriukivka Raion (district) of Chernihiv Oblast (province) in north-central Ukraine. It is located on the west bank of the Ubid River, a tributary of the Desna river, some 90 km (56 mi) from Chernihiv, the oblast center. It hosts the administration of Sosnytsia settlement hromada, one of the hromadas of Ukraine. Population: 6,589 (2022 estimate).

Sosnytsia was the birthplace of Alexander Dovzhenko, a prominent Ukrainian filmmaker; his original house has been preserved as a museum in Sosnytsia dedicated to his life and work.

== History ==
The name Sosnytsia derives from the same Slavic root as the word for pine tree (in Ukrainian: Сocнa), and the area was most likely named as such because the plentiful pine forests which have populated the area for ages. The name was first recorded in the Hypatian Codex, where a chronicle from the year 1234 mentions that Danylo of Halych, while assisting the Kievan Grand Princes in their battle with Michael of Chernigov, had liberated several towns, including Sosnytsia.

The area had clearly been settled much earlier, as archeological remains from Neolithic, Bronze Age, and Scythian settlements have been found in the area, as well as Roman coinage. Settlements from the age of Kievan Rus' in the area have yielded impressive examples of skilled metalwork, in addition to evidence of a developed agricultural society, capable of producing its own livestock. These settlements were sacked along with Chernihiv in 1239 by the hordes of Batu Khan.

The area was resettled in 1370 during the reign of the Grand Duchy of Lithuania, and after a military conflict, it was ceded to Muscovite Russia in 1503. The Polish–Lithuanian Commonwealth reclaimed the area in 1618, and in 1634 a fortress was constructed in the city by Guillaume Levasseur de Beauplan. Karpo Skydan raised a peasant rebellion against the Polish nobles in 1637, and by 1648 the area was taken by the Cossacks in their rebellion for self-rule. It transferred again to Polish rule after the Battle of Berestechko in 1651 as part of the Treaty of Bila Tserkva. This was shortly reversed in the aftermath of the Treaty of Pereyaslav, when Russia grew to encompass its eventual empire.

Until 18 July 2020, Sosnytsia was the administrative center of Sosnytsia Raion. The raion was abolished in July 2020 as part of the administrative reform of Ukraine, which reduced the number of raions of Chernihiv Oblast to five. The area of Sosnytsia Raion was merged into Koriukivka Raion.

During the Russian invasion of Ukraine, Russian forces drove through Sosnytsia on the night of 24–25 February in the direction of Chernihiv.

Until 26 January 2024, Sosnytsia was designated urban-type settlement. On this day, a new law entered into force which abolished this status, and Sosnytsia became a rural settlement.

== Notable people ==
- Alexander Dovzhenko (1894-1956) - Soviet-Ukrainian film director
- Marko Poltoratsky (1729-1795) - Russian baritone of Ukrainian Cossack origin
