= Volodymyr Ivanovych Barvinok =

Ukrainian historian, writer, and politician (1879–1943)

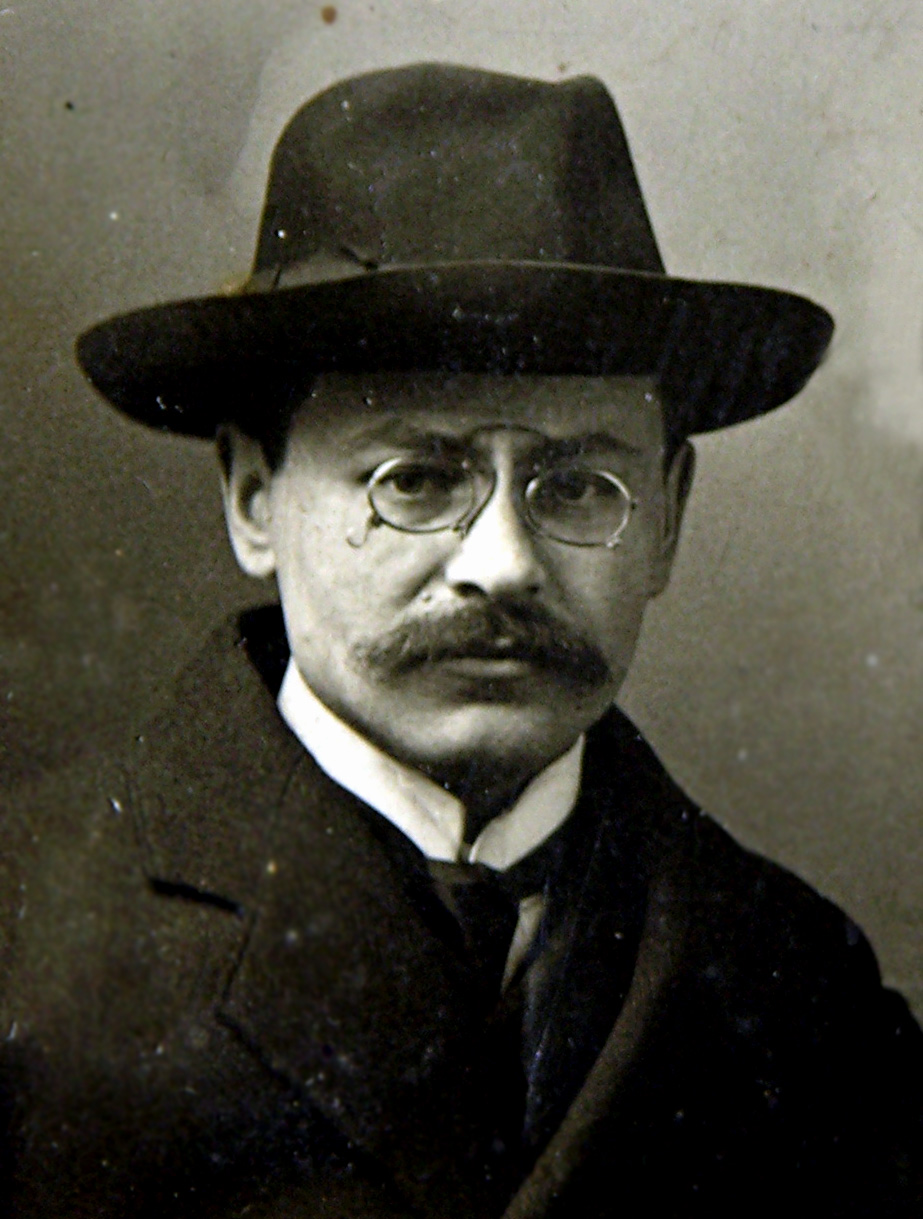
- Володимир Іванович Барвінок
- Born: July 22, 1879; Okhramiievychi, Ukraine, Russian Empire
- Died: 1943 (aged 63–64); Kiev, Ukrainian SSR, Soviet Union
- Education: Kyiv Mohyla Academy; Saint Petersburg University; St.Petersburg Archeologic Institute
- Known for: Work on ancient Ukrainian and Russian manuscripts and prints
- Scientific career
- Fields: Historian, writer, bibliographer, theologist, statesman
- Workplaces: National Academy of Science of Ukraine

Volodymyr Ivanovych Barvinok (Ukrainian: Володи́мир Іва́нович Барві́нок; July 22, 1879 in Okhramiievychi, Russian Empire – 1943 in Kiev, Soviet Union) was a Ukrainian historian, theologist, bibliographer, writer, archaeologist, prominent archivist, statesman of the Ukrainian National Republic, honorary citizen of the Chernihiv region, scholar at the Ukrainian Academy of Science and teacher of Ukrainian culture and history.

== Early life ==
Volodymyr Barvinok was born in 1879 at the family country house, which was located in the Okhramiievychi village in the Russian Empire. In 1905, Barvinok graduated from the Kyiv Mohyla Academy, which today is called the National University of Kyiv-Mohyla Academy. On the same year, he married Yevheniya Volovik, who was originally from Uman. The Barvinok family lived in the Podil district of Kyiv, at 31 Frunze street.

From 1905 to 1917, Volodymyr Barvinok and his family lived in St. Petersburg, where his son Boris was born. From 1905 to 1908, Barvinok studied in Saint Petersburg Archeological Institute. From 1908 to 1911, he majored in history and philology at the St. Petersburg University, then called Petrograd University. Consequently, he earned a master's degree in theology.

== Involvement in Ukrainian War of Independence ==
Until 1917, he worked in the central apparatus of the Most Holy Synod. At the same time, during 1912–1917, he lectured in history at the St. Petersburg's Realschule of A.I. Gelda. Upon receiving the first news of the revolution, Volodymyr Barvinok immediately returned to Kyiv, where he was deeply involved in the renewal of Ukrainian independence.

By 1918, Volodymyr Barvinok, as a prominent bibliographer and a scholar of ancient manuscripts and books, assisted in the formation of the National Library of Ukrainian State. From 1918 to 1919, he worked for the Ukrainian State, later for the Ukrainian National Republic at the department of confessions, then for the Ministry of Confessions.

The department regulated and conducted the state policy towards the Church. The Ministry demanded from the Church an implementation of a Ukrainization policy of the official documents and pushed for the independence (autocephaly) of the Ukrainian Orthodox Church from the Moscow Patriarchate. Simultaneously to his work at the Ukrainian National Republic's government institutions, Barvinok worked as a professor of literature and Ukrainian culture at a technical school in Kyiv.

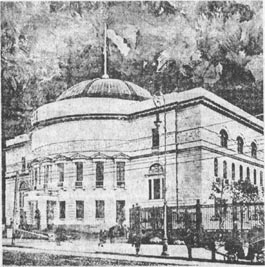
Central Rada building in Kyiv, where Barvinok was actively involved in the building of the independent Ukrainian state

. As the Ukrainian People's Army retreated from Kyiv and independent Ukraine fell, Barvinok remained in occupied Kyiv and focused on scientific work..

== Archeological work during Soviet occupation ==
During the period of 1918–1928, Barvinok worked at the historical-philological branch of the Ukrainian Academy of Science. Despite political repression and a difficult financial situation, the historical-philological department worked persistently to expand the use of the Ukrainian language in all branches of science..

On September 30, 1924, Barvinok became the secretary of a commission created on the 350th anniversary of the printing traditions in Ukraine, under the larger Archaeological Committee of the Ukrainian Academy of Science headed by the first president of Ukraine and renowned historian Mykhailo Hrushevskyi. The aim of Barvinok's commission was to write a scientific description of the publications on the territory of ethnographic Ukraine in 16th–18th centuries.

From 1924 until 1933, Barvinok worked on the archaeological committee at the Ukrainian Academy of Science. At the same time, he worked for the Ukrainian Scientific Institute of Printing, where he published the prominent and comprehensive work "General survey of old prints in libraries of Kiev". In the introduction, he criticizes the lack of financing for the Ukrainian Academy of Science and underlines principal differences between old prints of Kiev and Moscow, both dangerous acts at the time. From 1928 to 1930, he worked as a secretary of the Sophia commission of the Academy of Science and its art branch.

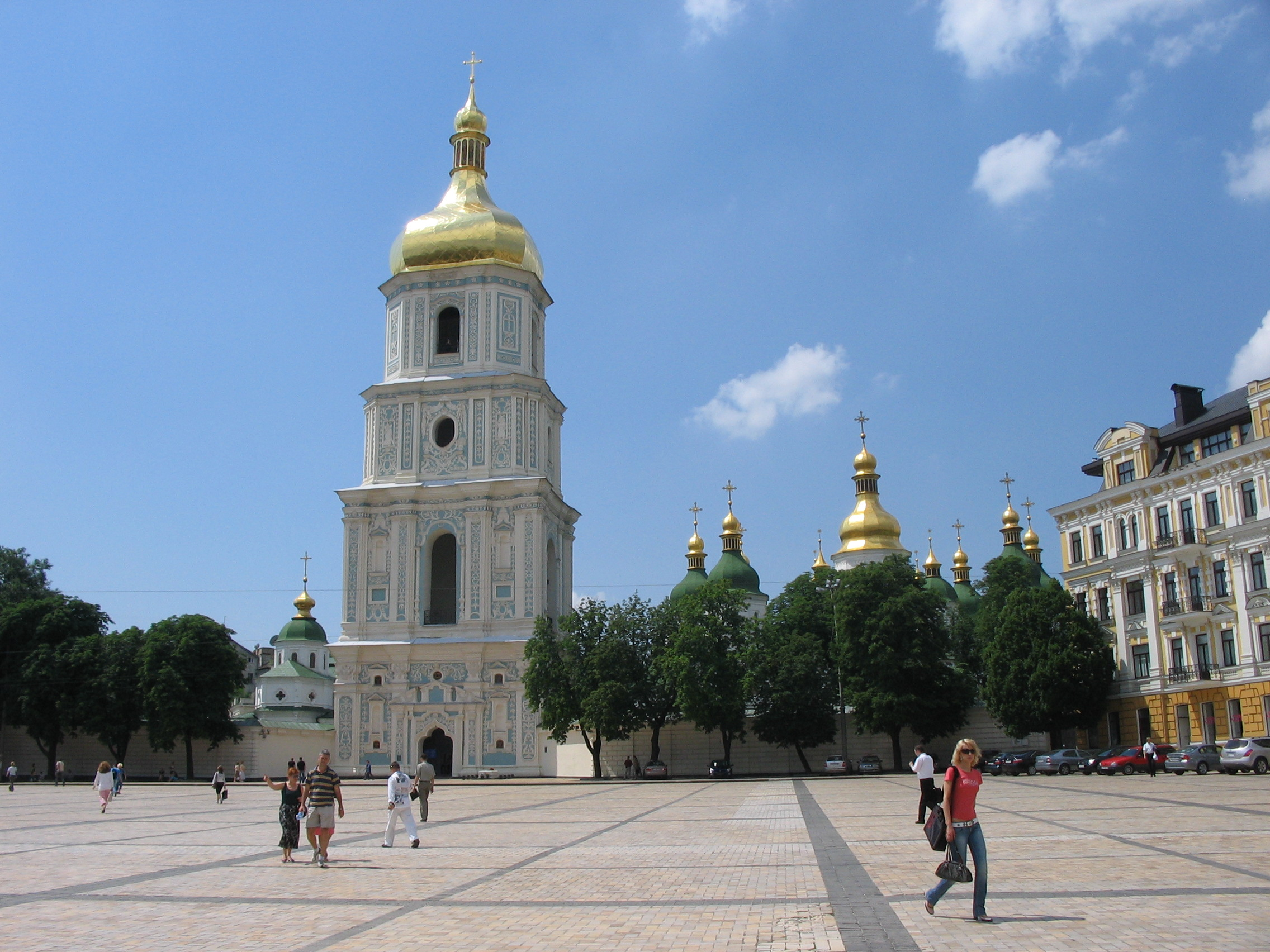
Barvinok was secretary of a commission that saved Saint Sophia cathedral from destruction

The Sophia commission aimed at preserving Saint Sophia Cathedral in Kyiv, which Soviet authorities planned to demolish as they had destroyed St. Michael's Golden-Domed Monastery. Soviet authorities aimed at eradicating any signs of authentic Ukrainian cultural heritage. Due to the tedious work of the commission, Saint Sophia cathedral, arguably the most historically important Ukrainian structure, was not destroyed.

== Later life and death ==
In the mid-1930s, Barvinok donated his vast library to the Kyiv University, where it formed the basis of several scientific branches. In the period from 1930 to 1933, Barvinok worked as the secretary of the All Ukrainian Archaeological Committee, which co-ordinated all archaeological work in Ukraine.

== Personal life ==
In 1930, his grandson Yury was born. In 1937, his son Boris, a bridge engineer, was arrested by the Soviet secret police (the NKVD) and Barvinok never saw him again. This was not the first instance of repression against Volodymyr Barvinok's family.
