= Koriukivka urban hromada =

Urban hromada of Chernihiv Oblast, Ukraine

Koriukivka urban hromada Корюківська міська громада
- Hromada
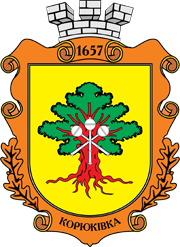
- Coat of arms
- Interactive map of Koriukivka urban hromada
- Country: Ukraine
- Oblast: Chernihiv
- Raion: Koriukivka

Area
  - Total: 1,172.6 km^{2} (452.7 sq mi)

Population (2023)
  - Total: 13,604
  - Density: 11.602/km^{2} (30.048/sq mi)
- Settlements: 64
- Cities: 1
- Villages: 63
- Website: koryukivka-rada.gov.ua

Koriukivka urban territorial hromada (Ukrainian: Корюківська міська територіальна громада, romanized: Koriukivska miska terytorialna hromada) is one of the hromadas of Ukraine, located within Koriukivka Raion in Chernihiv Oblast. Its administrative centre is the city of Koriukivka.

The total area of the hromada is 1,172.6 km^{2} (452.7 mi^{2}), and the population is 13,604 (as of 2023).

The hromada was originally established as an amalgamated hromada on 18 December 2016, before being expanded to its current size in 2020 as part of decentralisation in Ukraine.

== Composition ==
In addition to one city (Koriukivka), the hromada includes 63 villages:

- Andronyky
- Baliasy
- Beshkivka
- Biloshytska Sloboda
- Bohdalivka
- Brech
- Buda
- Budyshche
- Burkivka
- Domashlyn
- Hurynivka
- Hutyshche
- Kostiantynivka
- Kostiuchky
- Kuhuky
- Kyrylivka
- Lebiddia
- Lisove
- Lubenets
- Lukovets
- Lupasove
- Maibutnie
- Makhovyky
- Naumivka
- Nova Buda
- Nova Hurynivka
- Novoselivka
- Okhramiievychi
- Oleksandrivka
- Oliinyky
- Ozeredy
- Parastovske
- Peredil
- Pereliub
- Petrova Sloboda
- Pisky
- Prybyn
- Reimentarivka
- Romanivska Buda
- Rudnia
- Rybynsk
- Sakhutivka
- Samotuhy
- Samsonivka
- Savynky
- Sosnivka
- Spychuvate
- Stopylka
- Siardyne
- Telne
- Trudovyk
- Turivka
- Tiutiunnytsia
- Khovdiivka
- Khotiivka
- Shyshka
- Shyshkivka
- Verkholissia
- Volovyky
- Vysoke
- Zabarivka
- Zaliaddia
- Zhuravleva Buda

And 2 rural-type settlements: Dovha Hreblia and Holubivshchyna.

== Geography ==
Koriukivka urban hromada is located in the northern part of Chernihiv Oblast, occupies the northeastern part of the Koriukivka Raion. It borders with Novgorod-Siverskyi raion of Chernihiv Oblast and in the north with Russia. The total area of the district is 13.60 km^{2}.

The area of the raion is located within the Dnieper Lowland. The relief of the surface of the district is a lowland, slightly undulating plain, sometimes dissected by river valleys. All rivers belong to the Dnieper basin. The left tributaries of the Desna River flow through the community, the largest river is Ubid.

The climate of Koriukivka urban hromada is moderately continental, with warm summers and relatively mild winters. The average temperature in January is about -7°C, and in July - +19°C. The average annual precipitation ranges from 550 to 660 mm, with the highest precipitation in the summer period.

The most common are sod-podzolic and gray forest soils. Koriukivka urban hromada is located in the natural zone of mixed forests, in Polissya. The main species in the forests are pine, oak, alder, ash, birch. Minerals – loam, sand.

The hromada is home to the Bretsky botanical reserve.

== Economy ==
The hromadas agriculture specializes in growing grain, oilseed and industrial crops, and producing livestock products - milk, meat, eggs. The Koriukivka urban hromada has a developed woodworking industry and food industry.

=== Transportation ===
Regional and state highways pass through the district. Highway H27 passes through the northeast part of the Koriukivka urban hromada. There are bus stations in Koriukivka. A railway has been laid from Koriukivka to Bakhmach (Southwestern Railways), the Koriukivka station is the terminal on the dead-end line.

== See also ==
- List of hromadas of Ukraine
