= Dachnaya, Blagoveshchensky District, Republic of Bashkortostan =

Dachnaya Дачная
- Village
- Location within Bashkortostan Location within Russia
- Coordinates: 55°16′N 56°15′E
- Country: Russia
- Region: Bashkortostan
- District: Blagoveshchensky District
- Time zone: UTC+5:00

Dachnaya (Russian: Дачная) is a rural locality (a village) in Pokrovsky Selsoviet, Blagoveshchensky District, Bashkortostan, Russia. The population was 5 as of 2010.

== Geography ==
Dachnaya is located 35 km northeast of Blagoveshchensk (the district's administrative centre) by road.
