= Sosnytsia settlement hromada =

Coordinates: 51°36′N 32°34′E

Sosnytsia settlement hromada Сосницька селищна громада
- Hromada
- Interactive map of Sosnytsia settlement hromada
- Country: Ukraine
- Oblast: Chernihiv
- Raion: Koriukivka

Area
  - Total: 798.8 km^{2} (308.4 sq mi)

Population (2020)
  - Total: 15,212
  - Density: 19.04/km^{2} (49.32/sq mi)
- CATOTTG code: UA74020070000037186
- Settlements: 41
- Rural settlements: 1
- Villages: 39
- Towns: 1
- Website: sosnitsa-rada.gov.ua

Sosnytsia settlement hromada (Ukrainian: Сосницька селищна громада) is a hromada of Ukraine, located in Koriukivka Raion, Chernihiv Oblast. The territory of the hromada is located within the Dnieper Lowland, in Polissya. Its administrative center is the town of Sosnytsia.

It has an area of 798.8 square kilometres (308.4 mi^{2}) and a population of 15,212, as of 2020.

== Composition ==
The hromada includes 41 settlements: 1 town (Sosnytsia), 39 villages:

- Bondarivka
- Butivka
- Velike Ustya
- Vilshane
- Volynka
- Hai
- Hannivka
- Hapishkivka
- Hutyshche
- Dolynske
- Zahrebella
- Zmitniv
- Kyriivka
- Knuti
- Kozlyanychi
- Konyatyn
- Kostyriv
- Kudrivka
- Kupchichi
- Lavy
- Lozova
- Lyashkivtsi
- Male Ustya
- Masalaivka
- Matviivka
- Pekariv
- Polissya
- Polevo
- Prohony
- Rudnya
- Svirok
- Synyutyn
- Sosnivka
- Spaske
- Starobutivka
- Filonivka
- Khlopyaniki
- Chornotychi
- Yaklychi

And 1 rural-type settlement: Mala Bondarivka.

== Geography ==
Sosnytsia settlement hromada is located in the southeast part of Koryukivskyi raion. The distance to Chernihiv is 89 km. The total area of the district is 806,80 km^{2}.

The territory of the hromada is located within the Dnieper Lowland. The relief of the surface of the district is a lowland, slightly undulating plain, sometimes dissected by river valleys. All rivers belong to the Dnieper basin. The Desna River and its tributary Ubid flow through the territory of the community. The climate of Sosnytsia settlement hromada is moderately continental, with warm summers and relatively mild winters. The average temperature in January is about -7°C, and in July - +19°C. The average annual precipitation ranges from 550 to 600 mm, with the highest precipitation in the summer period.

The most common are sod-podzolic and gray forest soils. The Snovsk urban hromada is located in the natural zone of mixed forests, in Polissya. Forests occupy 27% of the hromadas area. The main species in the forests are pine, oak, alder, ash, birch. There are no major environmental pollutants in the hromada.

Regional roads and the H27 state highway pass through the hromada. There is no railway.

== See also ==
- List of hromadas of Ukraine
