= Kholmy settlement hromada =

Kholmy settlement hromada Холминська селищна громада
- Hromada
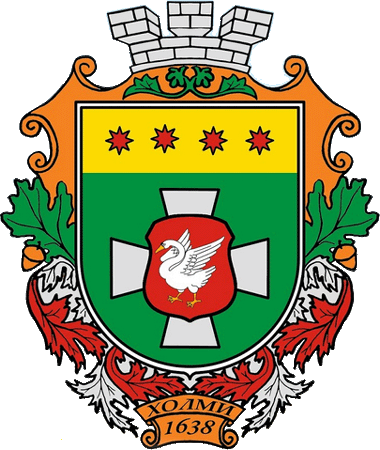
- Coat of arms
- Interactive map of Kholmy settlement hromada
- Country: Ukraine
- Oblast: Chernihiv
- Raion: Koriukivka

Area
  - Total: 320.3 km^{2} (123.7 sq mi)

Population (2025)
  - Total: 4,504
  - Density: 14.06/km^{2} (36.42/sq mi)
- CATOTTG code: UA74020090000083820
- Settlements: 15
- Rural settlements: 1
- Villages: 13
- Towns: 1
- Website: holmsr.gov.ua

Kholmy settlement hromada (Ukrainian: Холминська селищна громада) is a hromada of Ukraine, located in Koriukivka Raion, Chernihiv Oblast. Its administrative center is the town of Kholmy.

It has an area of 324 km^{2} and a population of 4,504, as of 2025.

== Composition ==
The hromada includes 15 settlements: 1 town (Kholmy), 13 villages:

- Berezova Roscha
- Bobryk
- Borok
- Dachne
- Zhuklya
- Kamka
- Kozylivka
- Kuchugury
- Oleshnya
- Radomka
- Tikhonivske
- Urechya
- Chenchyki

And 1 rural-type settlement: Dovzhik.

== Geography ==
Kholmy settlement hromada is located in the northern part of Koryukivskyi raion. The distance to the regional center by railway is 115 km.The total area of the district is 324 km^{2}.

The territory of the hromada is located within the Dnieper Lowland. The relief of the surface of the district is a lowland, slightly undulating plain, sometimes dissected by river valleys. All rivers belong to the Dnieper basin. The Ubid River, a left tributary of the Desna, flows through the community.

The climate of Kholmy settlement hromada is moderately continental, with warm summers and relatively mild winters. The average temperature in January is about -7°C, and in July - +19°C. The average annual precipitation ranges from 550 to 660 mm, with the highest precipitation in the summer period.

The most common are sod-podzolic and gray forest soils. The Kholmy settlement hromada is located in the natural zone of mixed forests, in Polissya. Forests occupy more than 60% of the hromadas territory. The main species in the forests are pine, oak, alder, ash, birch. Minerals – loam, peat, sand.

== Economy ==
The hromadas agriculture specializes in growing grain, oilseed and industrial crops, and producing livestock products - milk, meat, eggs. The raion has a developed woodworking industry and food industry.

=== Transportation ===
Regional highways pass through the Kholmy settlement hromada. There is no rail connection.

== See also ==
- List of hromadas of Ukraine
