= Mena, Ukraine =

City in Chernihiv Oblast, Ukraine

Mena Мена
- City
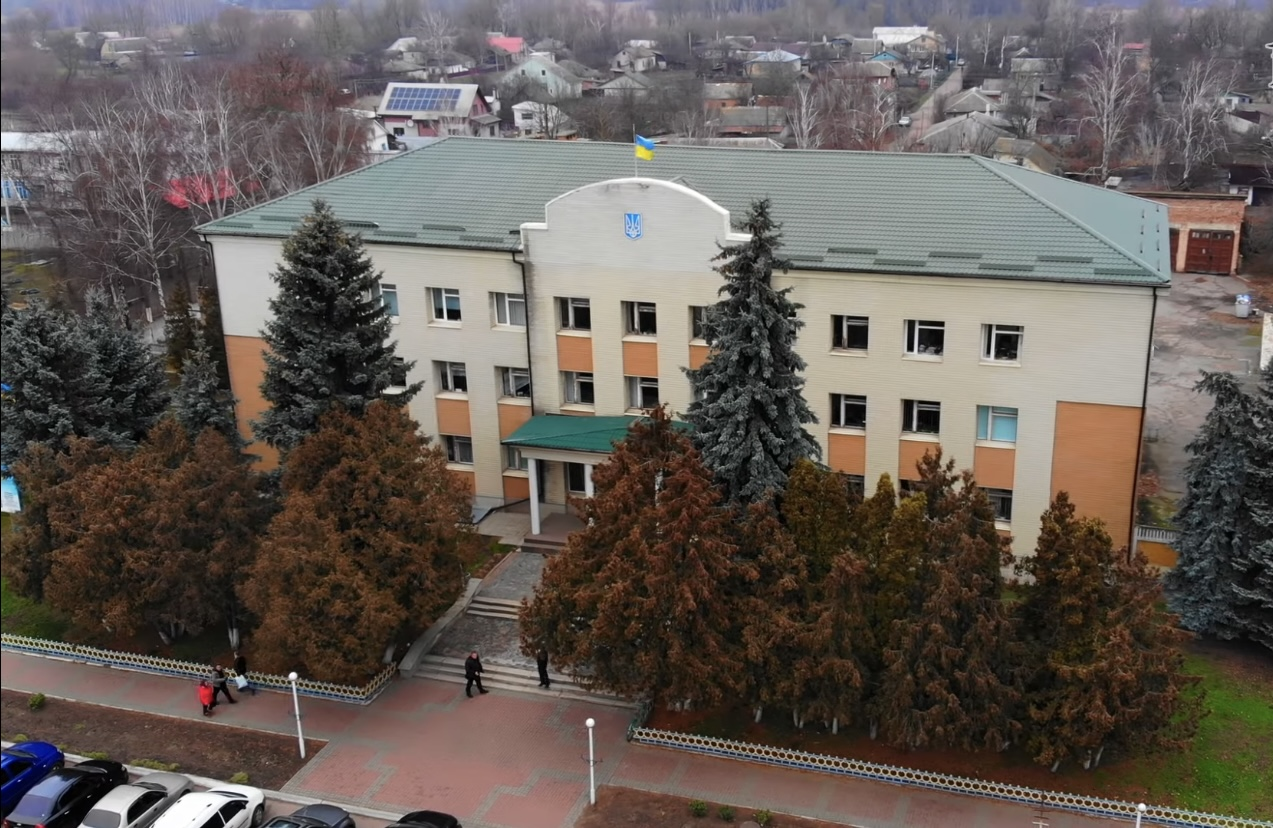
- City Hall

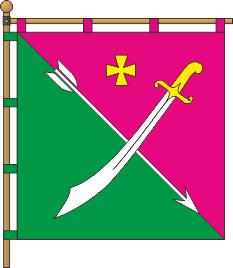
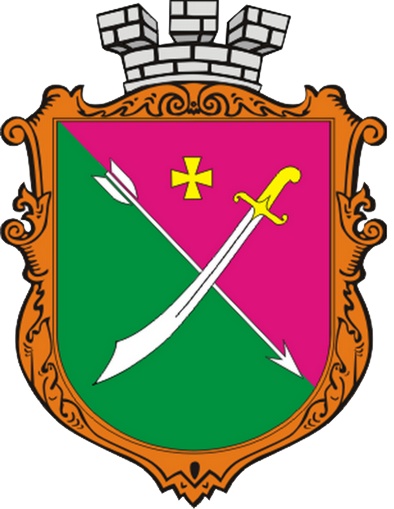
- Flag Seal

- Location within Chernihiv Oblast Location within Ukraine
- Coordinates: 51°31′00″N 32°13′00″E
- Country: Ukraine
- Oblast: Chernihiv Oblast
- Raion: Koriukivka Raion
- Hromada: Mena urban hromada
- First mentioned: 1408

Area
  - Total: 9.95 km^{2} (3.84 sq mi)

Population (2022)
  - Total: 10,935
- Time zone: UTC+2 (EET)
  - Summer (DST): UTC+3 (EEST)

Mena (Ukrainian: Мена [ˈmɛnɐ]) is a city in Koriukivka Raion, Chernihiv Oblast (province) of Ukraine. It hosts the administration of Mena urban hromada, one of the hromadas of Ukraine. Population: 10,935 (2022 estimate).

== History ==
First mentioned under the year 1066, until the 13th century Mena was an important trading point and served as a fortress. Later in its history the town became a centre of tobacco cultivation, which spread from there around the surrounding Chernihiv and Poltava regions. During Soviet times a tobacco fermentation plant operated in the town. In 1959 its population reached 7400 inhabitants.

Until 18 July 2020, Mena was the administrative center of Mena Raion. The raion was abolished in July 2020 as part of the administrative reform of Ukraine, which reduced the number of raions of Chernihiv Oblast to five. The area of Mena Raion was split between Chernihiv and Koriukivka Raions, with Mena being transferred to Chernihiv Raion.

== Geography ==
Mena is located in the south part of Koryukivskyi raion. The distance from Mena to the district center is 31 km, to the regional center is 69 km, to Kyiv is 208 km. The total area of the is city 15,33 km^{2}.

The territory of the Mena is located within the Dnieper Lowland. The relief of the surface of the city is a lowland. The city of Mena is located on the banks of the Mena River (a tributary of the Desna River).

The climate of Mena is moderately continental, with warm summers and relatively mild winters. The average temperature in January is about -7 °C, and in July―+19 °C. The average annual precipitation ranges from 550 to 580 mm, with the highest precipitation in the summer period.

The most common are sod-podzolic and gray forest soils. The Mena is located in the natural zone of mixed forests, in Polissya. The main species in the forests are pine, oak, alder, ash, birch.

== Demographics ==
As of the 2001 Ukrainian census, Mena had a population of 12,590 inhabitants, which decreased to 10,935 in early 2022. The ethnic and linguistic makeup of the town's population was as follows:

Ethnic groups in Mena
| | percent |
| Ukrainians | 96.10% |
| Russians | 3.01% |
| Belarusians | 0.49% |
| others | 0.40% |

Native languages in Mena
| | percent |
| Ukrainian | 96.7% |
| Russian | 2.9% |
| Belarusian | 0.2% |
| others | 0.1% |

== Economy ==
The Mena agriculture specializes in growing grain, oilseed and industrial crops, and producing livestock products - milk, meat, eggs. The city has a developed woodworking industry and food industry.There is a mineral water well located on the territory of the city, which provides the operation of the mineral water plant.

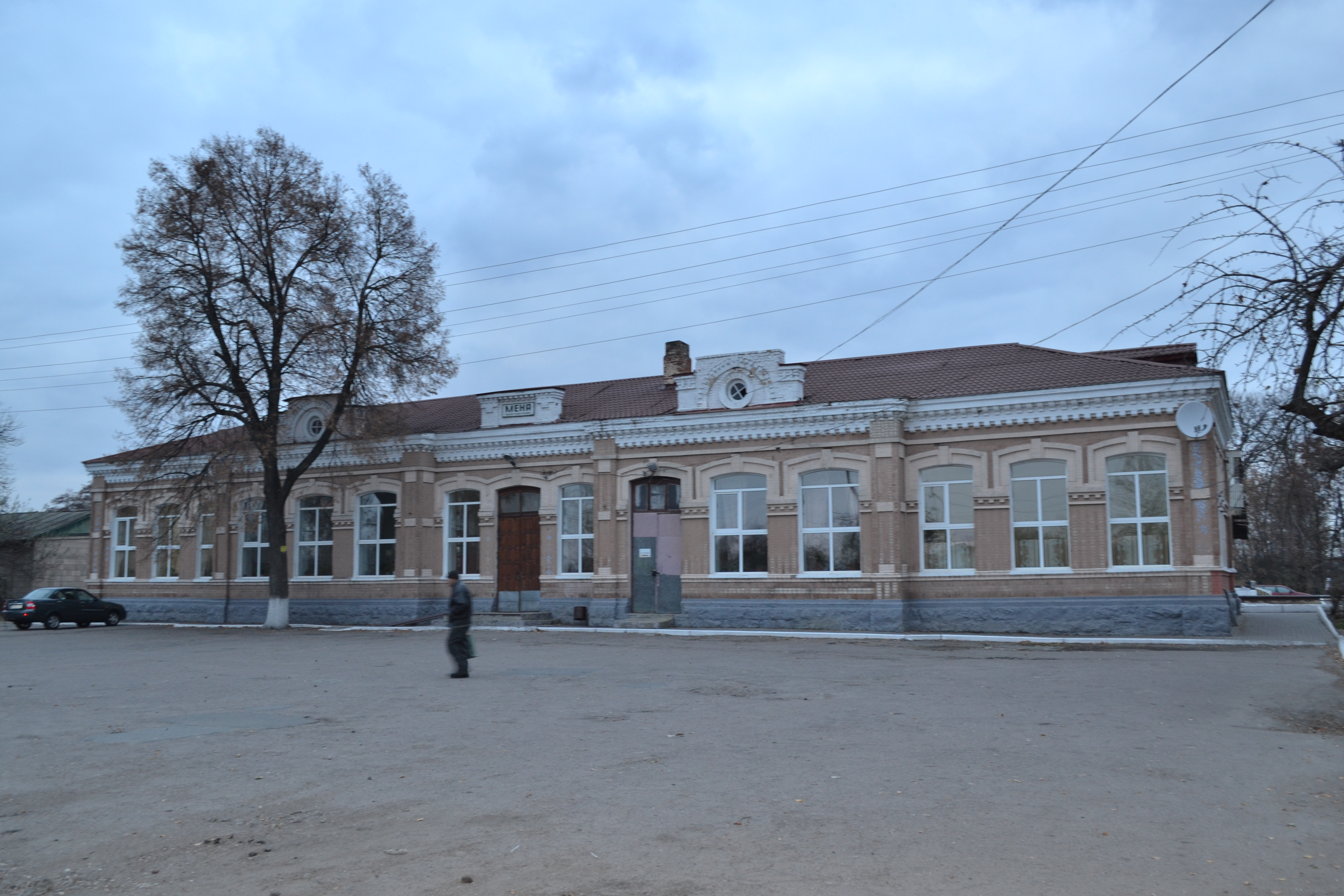
Mena railway station

=== Transportation ===
Regional highways and the H27 state road pass through Mena. Mena Station is an intermediate railway station of the South-Western Railway on the Bakhmach - Gomel line. The station is intended for passenger and freight services.

== Notable people ==
- Anatoliy Romanchenko, footballer of FC Chernihiv with 132 club caps
