= Dachnaya, Beloretsky District, Republic of Bashkortostan =

Dachnaya Дачная
- Village
- Location within Bashkortostan Location within Russia
- Coordinates: 53°53′N 58°09′E
- Country: Russia
- Region: Bashkortostan
- District: Beloretsky District
- Time zone: UTC+5:00

Dachnaya (Russian: Дачная) is a rural locality (a village) in Sermenevsky Selsoviet, Beloretsky District, Bashkortostan, Russia. The population was 34 as of 2010. There is 1 street.

== Geography ==
Dachnaya is located 21 km southwest of Beloretsk (the district's administrative centre) by road. Sermenevo is the nearest rural locality.
