= Dachnoye, Vologda Oblast =

Dachnoye Дачное
- Village
- Location within Vologda Oblast Location within Russia
- Coordinates: 59°23′N 41°12′E
- Country: Russia
- Region: Vologda Oblast
- District: Mezhdurechensky District
- Time zone: UTC+3:00

Dachnoye (Russian: Дачное) is a rural locality (a village) in Sukhonskoye Rural Settlement, Mezhdurechensky District, Vologda Oblast, Russia. The population was 8 as of 2002.

== Geography ==
Dachnoye is located 26 km northeast of Shuyskoye (the district's administrative centre) by road. Krasotinka is the nearest rural locality.
