= Berezna settlement hromada =

Berezna settlement hromada Березнянська селищна громада
- Hromada
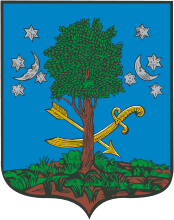
- Coat of arms
- Interactive map of Berezna settlement hromada
- Country: Ukraine
- Oblast: Chernihiv
- Raion: Chernihiv

Area
  - Total: 352.5 km^{2} (136.1 sq mi)

Population (2020)
  - Total: 7,505
  - Density: 21.29/km^{2} (55.14/sq mi)
- CATOTTG code: UA74100010000063674
- Settlements: 17
- Rural settlements: 1
- Villages: 15
- Towns: 1
- Website: berezna.cg.gov.ua

Berezna settlement hromada (Ukrainian: Березнянська селищна громада) is a hromada of Ukraine, located in Chernihiv Raion, Chernihiv Oblast. Its administrative center is the town of Berezna. The territory of the Berezna is located within the Dnieper Lowland, belong to the Dnieper basin. It has an area of 352.5 square kilometres (136.1 mi^{2}) and a population of 7,505, as of 2020.

== Composition ==
The hromada includes 17 settlements: one town (Berezna), 15 villages:

- Bihach
- Horytsia
- Hreblya
- Husavka
- Kamianka
- Klymentinivka
- Loknyste
- Luhove
- Mykolaivka
- Moschne
- Murivka
- Podyn
- Sakhnivka
- Svyati Hory
- Yaskove

And 1 rural-type settlement: Domnytsia.

== Geography ==
The Berezna settlement hromada is located in the east of Chernihiv raion. The territory of the Berezna settlement hromada is located within the Dnieper Lowland, belong to the Dnieper basin. The hromada is located between the Snov River (west) and the Desna River (south). The relief of the surface of the hromada is a lowland, slightly undulating plain, sometimes dissected by river valleys.

The climate of Berezna settlement hromada is moderately continental, with warm summers and relatively mild winters. The average temperature in January is about −7 °C, and in July - +19 °C. The average annual precipitation ranges from 550 to 660 mm, with the highest precipitation in the summer period.

The most common are sod-podzolic and gray forest soils. The Berezna settlement hromada is located in the natural zone of mixed forests, in Polissya. The main species in the forests are pine, oak, alder, ash, birch. Minerals – loam, peat, sand, brown coal.

== Economy ==
=== Transportation ===
Berezna settlement hromada is on Highway H27, connecting Chernihiv and Novhorod-Siverskyi. The nearest railway station is located in the city of Chernihiv.

== See also ==
- List of hromadas of Ukraine
