= Snovsk urban hromada =

Coordinates: 51°52′N 31°55′E

Snovsk urban hromada Сновська міська громада
- Hromada
- Flag Coat of arms
- Interactive map of Snovsk urban hromada
- Country: Ukraine
- Oblast: Chernihiv
- Raion: Koriukivka

Area
  - Total: 1,283.1 km^{2} (495.4 sq mi)

Population (2020)
  - Total: 22,026
  - Density: 17.166/km^{2} (44.460/sq mi)
- CATOTTG code: UA74020050000033944
- Settlements: 57
- Cities: 1
- Rural settlements: 1
- Villages: 55
- Website: snovmr.gov.ua

Snovsk urban hromada (Ukrainian: Сновська міська громада) is a hromada of Ukraine, located in Koriukivka Raion, Chernihiv Oblast. The territory of the hromada is located within the Dnieper Lowland, in Polissya. Its administrative center is the city Snovsk.

It has an area of 1,283.1 square kilometres (495.4 mi^{2}) and a population of 22,026, as of 2020.

== Composition ==
The hromada contains 19 settlements: 1 city (Snovsk), 55 villages:

- Bezuhlivka
- Velikiy Shchymel
- Hvozdykivka
- Hirsk
- Hlybokiy Rih
- Huta-Studenetska
- Yeline
- Yenkova Rudnya
- Zhovid
- Zhuravok
- Zahrebelna Sloboda
- Zaymishche
- Zarechye
- Ivanivka
- Ilkucha
- Kamka
- Klyusy
- Krestopivshchyna
- Kuropiiivka
- Kuchynivka
- Lypivka
- Loseva Sloboda
- Lyutivka
- Mykhailivka
- Myshine
- Mystki
- Mlynok
- Nizkivka
- Novi Borovichi
- Novi Mlyny
- Petrivka
- Pishchanka
- Plohiv
- Popilnya
- Privilne
- Radvyne
- Rohizky
- Ruda village
- Salne
- Selishche
- Slava
- Smyach
- Snovske
- Sofiivka
- Stara Rudnya
- Stari Borovichi
- Sunychne
- Tikhonovichi
- Turya
- Filonivka
- Khotunichi
- Khrinivka
- Chepeliv
- Shkrobove
- Shkot

And 1 rural-type settlement: Luka.

== Geography ==
Snovsk urban hromada is located in the northwest part of Koryukivskyi raion. It borders with Russia. The distance to the regional center by rail is 249 km, by road – 72 km. The total area of the district is 1283 km^{2}.

The territory of the hromada is located within the Dnieper Lowland. The relief of the surface of the district is a lowland, slightly undulating plain, sometimes dissected by river valleys. All rivers belong to the Dnieper basin. The Snov River, a left tributary of the Desna River, flows through the territory. The climate of Snovsk urban hromada is moderately continental, with warm summers and relatively mild winters. The average temperature in January is about -7 °C, and in July - +19 °C. The average annual precipitation ranges from 550 to 600 mm, with the highest precipitation in the summer period.

The most common are sod-podzolic and gray forest soils. The Snovsk urban hromada is located in the natural zone of mixed forests, in Polissya. The main species in the forests are pine, oak, alder, ash, birch.

== Economy ==
The hromadas agriculture specializes in growing grain, oilseed and industrial crops, and producing livestock products - milk, meat, eggs. The raion has a developed woodworking industry and food industry. There is a locomotive depot in Snovsk, which carries out repairs and maintenance of locomotives and steam locomotives.

=== Transportation ===
Regional and state highways, as well as the Southwestern Railway, pass through the hromada.

== See also ==
- List of hromadas of Ukraine
