= Mena urban hromada =

Coordinates: 51°30′N 32°08′E

Mena urban hromada Менська міська громада
- Hromada
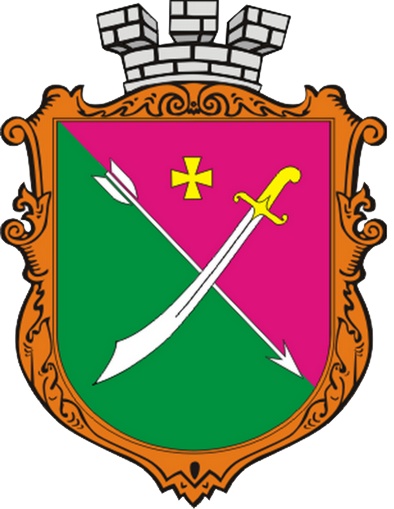
- Coat of arms
- Interactive map of Mena urban hromada
- Country: Ukraine
- Oblast: Chernihiv
- Raion: Koriukivka

Area
  - Total: 1,026.1 km^{2} (396.2 sq mi)

Population (2020)
  - Total: 25,581
  - Density: 24.930/km^{2} (64.569/sq mi)
- CATOTTG code: UA74020030000069340
- Settlements: 39
- Cities: 1
- Rural settlements: 3
- Villages: 34
- Towns: 1
- Website: mena.cg.gov.ua

Mena urban hromada (Ukrainian: Менська міська громада) is a hromada of Ukraine, located in Chernihiv Oblast. Mena urban hromada is located in the south part of Koriukivka Raion, within the Dnieper Lowland, in Polissya. Its administrative center is the city Mena.

It has an area of 1,026.1 square kilometres (396.2 mi^{2}) and a population of 25,581, as of 2020.

== Composition ==
The hromada contains 19 settlements: 1 city (Mena), 1 town (Makoshine), 34 villages:

- Birkivka
- Blystova
- Velichkivka
- Vesele
- Vilne
- Voloskivtsi
- Horodyshche
- Danylivka
- Derepivka
- Dibrivka
- Dmitrivka
- Diagova
- Zahorivka
- Kiselyvka
- Komarivka
- Kukovichi
- Lazarivka
- Lisky
- Luky
- Maiske
- Maksaki
- Novi Brody
- Ovcharivka
- Ostapivka
- Osmaki
- Pokrovske
- Semenivka
- Sinyavka
- Slobidka
- Stepanivka
- Stolne
- Ushnia
- Feskivka
- Chornohortsi

And 3 rural-type settlements: Kukovitske, Prohres, and Sadove.

== History ==
After the Russian invasion of Ukraine, during February–April 2022, the Mensk urban territorial community was under temporary occupation, was under shelling, and hostilities were taking place on its territory.

== Geography ==
Mena urban hromada is located in the south part of Koryukivskyi raion. The distance from Mena to the district center is 31 km, to the regional center is 69 km, to Kyiv is 208 km. The total area of the district is 4575.4 km^{2}.

The territory of the Mena urban hromada is located within the Dnieper Lowland. The relief of the surface of the hromada is a lowland, slightly undulating plain. All rivers belong to the Dnieper basin. The largest rivers are the Desna and its tributary the Ubid.

The climate of Mena urban hromada is moderately continental, with warm summers and relatively mild winters. The average temperature in January is about -7 °C, and in July―+19 °C. The average annual precipitation ranges from 550 to 580 mm, with the highest precipitation in the summer period.

The most common are sod-podzolic and gray forest soils. The Mena urban hromada is located in the natural zone of mixed forests, in Polissya. 9% of the hromadas territory is covered by forests.The main species in the forests are pine, oak, alder, ash, birch.

The Mena urban hromada is home the Kamoretsk zoological reserve.

== Economy ==
The hromadas agriculture specializes in growing grain, oilseed and industrial crops, and producing livestock products - milk, meat, eggs. The raion has a developed woodworking industry and food industry.There is a mineral water well located on the territory of the hromada, which provides the operation of the mineral water plant.

=== Transportation ===
Regional highways and the H27 state road pass through Mena. Mena Station is an intermediate railway station of the South-Western Railway on the Bakhmach - Gomel line. The station is intended for passenger and freight services.

== See also ==
- List of hromadas of Ukraine
