= Dachne, Sudak Municipality =

Dachne Дачне
- Village
- Location of Dachne in Crimea
- Coordinates: 44°53′15″N 34°59′15″E
- Republic: Crimea
- Municipality: Sudak Municipality
- First mentioned: 1381

Area
  - Total: 1.34 km^{2} (0.52 sq mi)
- Elevation: 69 m (226 ft)

Population (2015)
  - Total: 2,628
  - Density: 1,960/km^{2} (5,080/sq mi)
- Time zone: UTC+4 (MSK)
- Postal code: 98023
- Area code: +380 6566
- Website: http://rada.gov.ua/

Dachne (Ukrainian: Дачне; Russian: Дачное) is a village in the Sudak Municipality of the Autonomous Republic of Crimea, a territory recognized by a majority of countries as part of Ukraine and annexed by Russia as the Republic of Crimea.

Previously, the settlement was known as the Taraktash village (Crimean Tatar: Taraq Taş). Following the forced deportation of the Crimean Tatars in 1944, the Presidium of the Supreme Soviet of the Russian SFSR published a decree on May 18, 1948 renaming the settlement along with many others throughout Crimea from their native Crimean Tatar names to their current variants.

Dachne is located on Crimea's southern shore at an elevation of 69 metres (226 ft). Its population was 2,454 in the 2001 Ukrainian census. Current population: 2,628 (2014 Census).
