= Snovsk =

Urban locality in Chernihiv Oblast, Ukraine

Snovsk Сновськ
- City
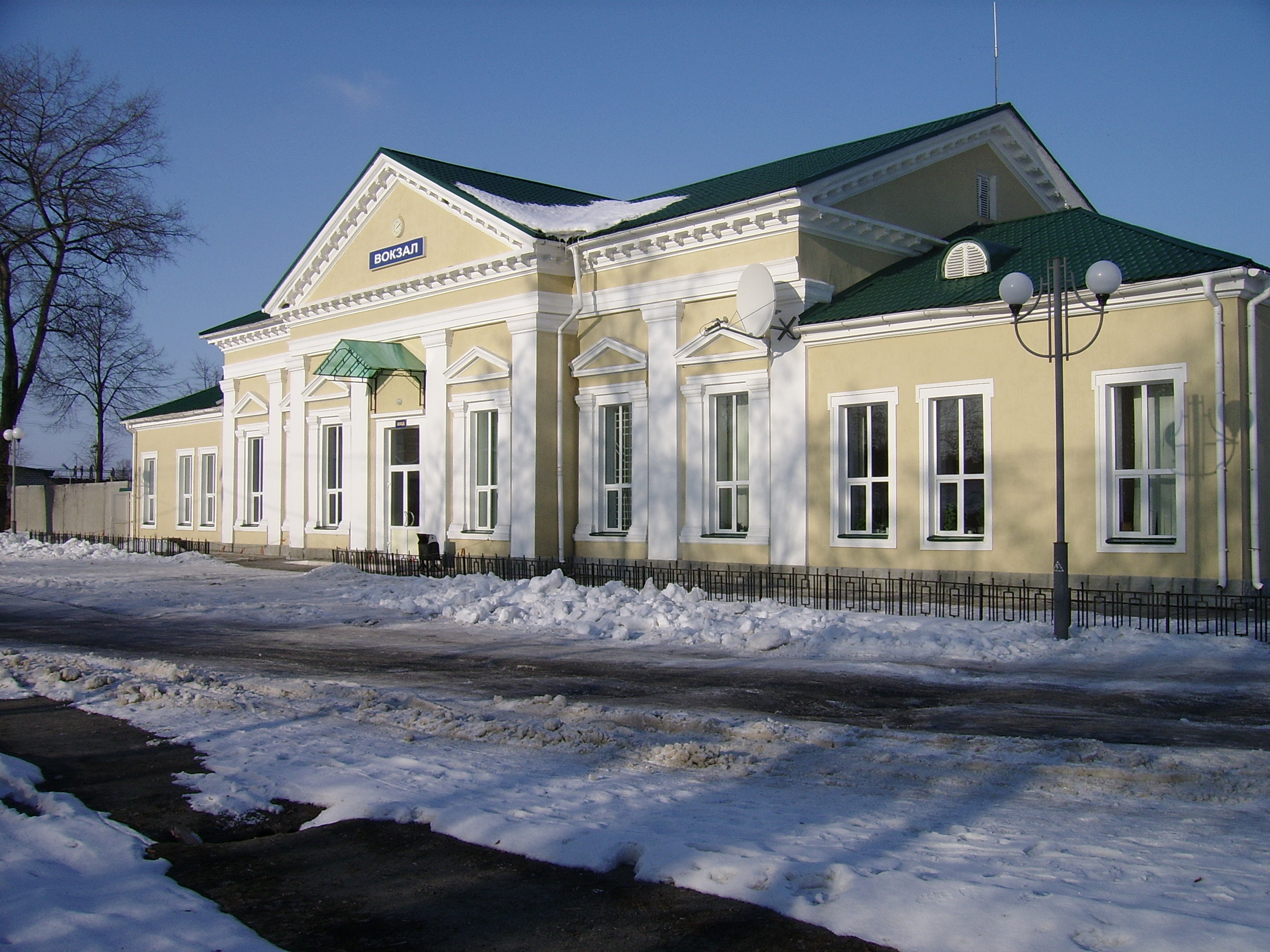
- Snovsk railway station

- Location within Chernihiv Oblast Location within Ukraine
- Coordinates: 51°49′13″N 31°57′03″E
- Country: Ukraine
- Oblast: Chernihiv Oblast
- Raion: Koriukivka Raion
- Hromada: Snovsk urban hromada
- Founded: 1860
- City status: 1924
- Control: Ukraine

Area
  - Total: 128 km^{2} (49 sq mi)
- Elevation: 119 m (390 ft)

Population (2022)
  - Total: 10,620
  - Estimate (2025): ▼10,468

Snovsk (Ukrainian: Сновськ [snɔu̯sʲk]) is a city in Koriukivka Raion, Chernihiv Oblast (province) of Ukraine. Population: 10,620 (2022 estimate). It hosts the administration of Snovsk urban hromada, one of the hromadas of Ukraine. The population was 12,315 in 2001.

== Name ==
Historically, the city was named after the Snov River on which it is situated. The city was called Shchors between 1935 and 2016, in honour of Mykola Shchors. On 21 May 2016, the Verkhovna Rada (Ukraine's national parliament) adopted a decision to change the name of Shchors back to its original Snovsk and consequently renaming Shchors Raion to Snovsk Raion, in accordance with the law prohibiting names of Communist origin.

== History ==
Established as the working settlement of Korzhivka during the construction of Libava-Romny Railway in the 1860s, Snovsk gained the status of a city in 1924.

On the eve of the Second World War, about 16% of the population was Jewish (1,402 Jews). The Germans occupied the city on September 3, 1941. They kept the Jews prisoners in a ghetto and subjected them to perform different kinds of forced labor. In 1941 and 1942, hundreds of them were murdered in mass executions perpetrated by an Einsatzgruppen in the nearby forest.

Until 18 July 2020, Snovsk was the administrative center of Snovsk Raion (before 2016, Shchors Raion). The raion was abolished in July 2020 as part of the administrative reform of Ukraine, which reduced the number of raions of Chernihiv Oblast to five. The area of Snovsk Raion was merged into Koriukivka Raion.

On the evening of February 24, 2022, Russian forces took the bypass road around the city, and the Ukrainian flag remained over the city council building the next morning. The Russian military entered the city on 25 March and detained the mayor, who was later released.

== Demographics ==
Historical population
Year	Pop.	±%
1897	2,200	—
1926	6,850	+211.4%
1983	12,100	+76.6%
2001	12,315	+1.8%
2022	10,620	−13.8%

In 1926 35,5% of the city's population was composed of Ukrainians, 35,3% of Jews and 16% of Russians. By 1939 these proportions had changed to 60%, 36% and 4% respectively.

== Economy ==
Snovsk is a location of railway service and food industry enterprises, as well as a furniture factory.

== Pints of interest ==
A museum dedicated to Mykola Shchors operated in the city during Soviet times.
