= Koriukivka =

City in Chernihiv Oblast, Ukraine

Koriukivka Корюківка
- City
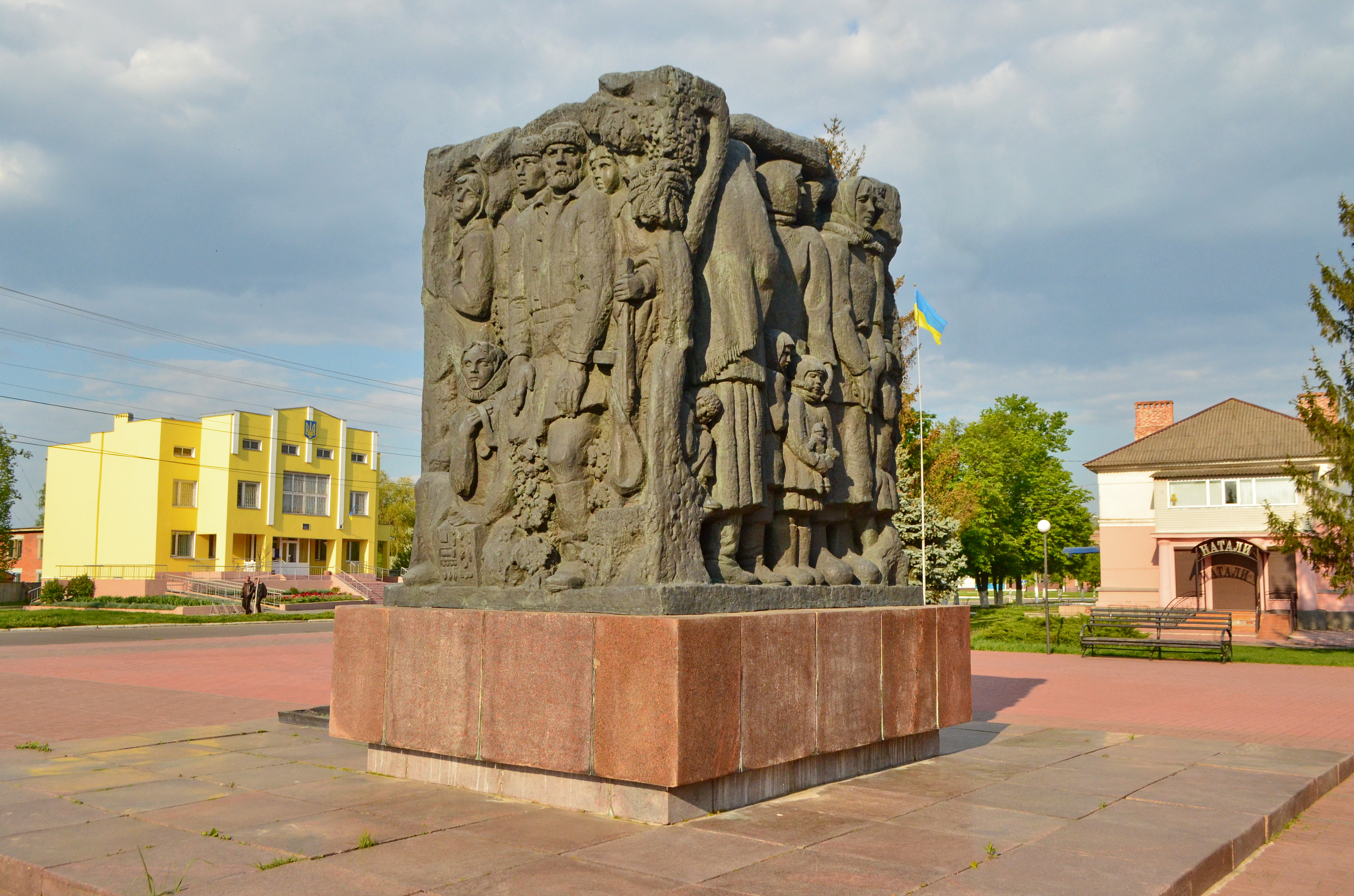
- The memorial to civilians killed by Nazi Germany

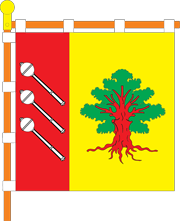
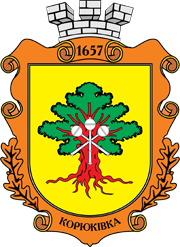
- Flag Coat of arms

- Location within Chernihiv Oblast Location within Ukraine
- Coordinates: 51°47′00″N 32°15′00″E
- Country: Ukraine
- Oblast: Chernihiv Oblast
- Raion: Koriukivka Raion
- Hromada: Koriukivka urban hromada

Government
  - Mayor: Ratan Akhmedov

Area
  - Total: 26.85 km^{2} (10.37 sq mi)

Population (2022)
  - Total: 12,202
- Website: koryukivka-rada.gov.ua

Koriukivka (Ukrainian: Корюківка, pronounced [koˈrʲukiu̯kɐ]) is a small city in Chernihiv Oblast (province) of Ukraine. It was founded in 1657, over 350 years ago, and it is the administrative center of Koriukivka Raion. The city hosts the administration of Koriukivka urban hromada, one of the hromadas of Ukraine. The population in 2021 is estimated to be 12,202 (2022 estimate).

== History ==
During the reign of the Hetman Bohdan Khmelnytsky in 1657, who was in search of free land for the nobility class and the settlers from the Right-Bank of Ukraine. A search headed by the Cossack Omelyan Karuka found the eventual site and deemed it fit for a small settlement due to the thick protection of the surrounding forests.

During the 20th century Koriukivka served as a terminal station of a branch of Homel-Bakhmach railway line. 6,500 inhabitants populated the settlement as of 1932. A paper factory, an oil mill and a sawmill operated there.

The city suffered heavy losses during the Second World War, when it became the site of a massacre. Koriukivka was almost totally burned, the population that lived there was exterminated, with the Germans and Hungarians killing around 6,700 people and burning 1,290 homes. The destruction of Koriukivka together with its inhabitants is the largest single "reprisal raid" war crime of the Nazi occupation during World War II.

During the Russian invasion of Ukraine, multiple Russian armored columns passed through Koriukivka during February and early March 2022. Russian forces did not return to the city after the beginning of March.

== Geography ==
The city rests on the Brech river, a tributary of the Snov. The local climate is moderate, with adequate moisture. The average annual rainfall is 614 mm, including the warm period - 439 mm. The average annual temperature - 6,1C. The absolute maximum temperature is 37C, but at least – 35C.

== Demographics ==
As of the 2001 Ukrainian census, Koriukivka had a population of 14,150 inhabitants. The ethnic and linguistic makeup of the town was as follows:

Ethnic groups in Koriukivka
	percent
Ukrainians	95.79%
Russians	3.39%
Belarusians	0.47%
others	0.35%

Native languages in Koriukivka
	percent
Ukrainian	95.3%
Russian	4.3%
Belarusian	0.2%
others	0.1%

== Economy ==
Modern Koriukivka contains a number of companies, the largest two of which is the corporation "Koriukivka factory of Technical Papers" (built on the sugar-refinery site burned during World War II) and the state enterprise "Koriukivka Forestry" production.

The city also has many successful and developing small businesses. With a registered list of small businesses, 73 entrepreneurial activities involving 639 individuals. The city has 100 commercial enterprises, of which 26 are Consumer Cooperatives.

Many investors find Koriukivka an attractive site due to the presence of large tracts of forests, silica sand, clay and peat.

Historically, the city has had great and old industrial traditions. In the mid-nineteenth century, the foreign entrepreneur Karl Rauch founded a distillery and sugar factory. In 1871, the Koriukivka sugar factory employed 600 people. The plant produced a season of sugar worth more than 5.5 million. Rubles. And in 1901 manufacturer LI Brodsky expanded the sugar-refinery, employing about 1,000 workers. In 1882 the Koriukivka sugar production was awarded the gold medal from the All-Russia Exhibition in Moscow, and after 18 years they received the highest award of the World Exhibition in Paris.

== Education ==
Koryukovka has a gymnasium, two secondary schools of the third degree, two secondary schools with which there are 1850 pupils, an arts school, a sports school and two kindergartens with over 400 children.

== Media ==
The district newspaper is called "Maiak" and there is a small radio-station that operates district-wide.

== Infrastructure ==
Koriukivka city is the center of the Koryukovka district within the Chernihiv region, located 100 kilometres (62 mi) from Chernhiv city, the regional center to the north of the territory. The city is also located at the intersection of highways of regional and local importance, in which there are bus connections to Chernhiv and neighboring district centers Snovsk, Mena, and Semenivka, and to other nearby places. The Koryukovka area has five public roads of local significance, all of which are paved (Т-25-12, Т-25-19, Т-25-32, Т-25-34 and Т-25-36).

The city planning structure is complicated with what is locally called a "multibeam-form" with similar districts spread around the various connecting roads. The area is built up unevenly, with most of the density in the city center where many service centers, schools, administrative, cultural, educational and medical facilities are located. In the apartment buildings near the center, additional service institutions, preschools, schools, and shopping centers have been developed.

Infrastructure development within Koriukivka has been uneven. In the downtown area and the two-story building area north of the center, most buildings are well equipped but in the western and eastern parts of the city many areas do not have complete water supply coverage.

The city has a central district hospital with 220 beds, a pharmacy, two cultural centers with 800 seats, two libraries, a historical museum, and the "Avangard" stadium.

== Sports and facilities ==
=== FC Avanhard Koriukivka ===
The main club of the village is Avanhard Koriukivka established in 1960. The club competes in the Chernihiv Oblast competition and in Ukrainian Football Amateur League.

== Sister cities ==
- Kazlų Rūda, Lithuania
