= Koriukivka Raion =

Subdivision of Chernihiv Oblast, Ukraine

Koriukivka Raion Корюківський район
- Raion
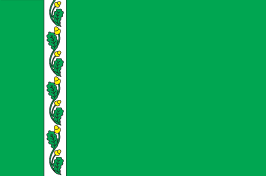
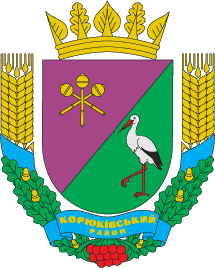
- Flag Coat of arms

- Koriukivka Raion location in Chernihiv Oblast
- Coordinates: 51°49′35″N 32°21′45″E
- Country: Ukraine
- Oblast: Chernihiv Oblast
- Admin. center: Koriukivka
- Subdivisions: 5 hromadas

Area
  - Total: 1,424 km^{2} (550 sq mi)

Population (2022)
  - Total: 86,435
  - Density: 60.70/km^{2} (157.2/sq mi)
- Time zone: UTC+2 (EET)
  - Summer (DST): UTC+3 (EEST)
- Website: http://koradm.cg.gov.ua/

Koriukivka Raion (Ukrainian: Корюківський район) is a raion (district) of Chernihiv Oblast, northern Ukraine. Its administrative centre is located at the town of Koriukivka. Population: 86,435 (2022 estimate).

On 18 July 2020, as part of the administrative reform of Ukraine, the number of raions of Chernihiv Oblast was reduced to five, and the area of Koriukivka Raion was significantly expanded. Two abolished raions, Snovsk and Sosnytsia Raions, as well as part of Mena Raion, were merged into Koriukivka Raion. The January 2020 estimate of the raion population was 25,422 (2020 est.).

== Subdivisions ==
=== Current ===
After the reform in July 2020, the raion consists of 5 hromadas:

- Kholmy settlement hromada with the administration in the rural settlement of Kholmy, retained from Koriukivka Raion;
- Koriukivka urban hromada with the administration in the city of Koriukivka, retained from Koriukivka Raion;
- Mena urban hromada with the administration in the city of Mena, transferred from Mena Raion;
- Snovsk urban hromada with the administration in the city of Snovsk, transferred from Snovsk Raion.
- Sosnytsia settlement hromada with the administration in the rural settlement of Sosnytsia, transferred from Sosnytsia Raion.

=== Before 2020 ===
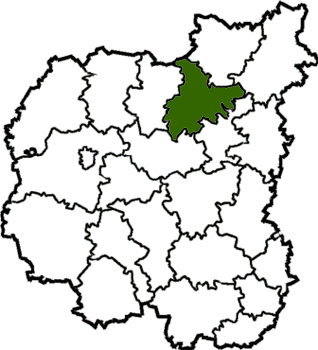
Koriukivka Raion in Chernihiv Oblast before 2020

Before the 2020 reform, the raion consisted of two hromadas:

- Kholmy settlement hromada with the administration in Kholmy;
- Koriukivka urban hromada with the administration in Koriukivka.

== Geography ==
Koriukivka Raion is located in the northern part of Chernihiv Oblast. It borders with Novgorod-Siverskyi, Chernihiv, Nizhyn raions of Chernihiv Oblast and in the north with Russia. The distance to the regional center by railway is 237 km, by highway 99 km.The total area of the district is 4575.4 km^{2}.

The area of the raion is located within the Dnieper Lowland. The relief of the surface of the district is a lowland, slightly undulating plain, sometimes dissected by river valleys. All rivers belong to the Dnieper basin. The largest rivers are the Desna with tributaries Snov and Ubid.

The climate of Koriukivka Raion is moderately continental, with warm summers and relatively mild winters. The average temperature in January is about -7°C, and in July - +19°C. The average annual precipitation ranges from 550 to 660 mm, with the highest precipitation in the summer period.

The most common are sod-podzolic and gray forest soils. Koriukivka Raion is located in the natural zone of mixed forests, in Polissya. The main species in the forests are pine, oak, alder, ash, birch. Minerals – loam, peat, sand, brown coal.

The district is home to national reserves: the Boloto "Moh" hydrological reserve, the Bretsky botanical reserve, and the Kamoretsk zoological reserve.

== Economy ==
There are 177 agricultural enterprises and farms operating in Koriukivka Raion. The raion's agriculture specializes in growing grain, oilseed and industrial crops, and producing livestock products - milk, meat, eggs. The raion has a developed woodworking industry and food industry.

=== Transportation ===
Regional and state highways pass through the district. Highway H27 passes through the southern part of the district, through Mena. There are bus stations in Koriukivka and the village of Kholmy. A railway has been laid from Koriukivka to Bakhmach (Southwestern Railways), the Koriukivka station is the terminal on the dead-end line.
