= Nachalovo =

Rural locality in Astrakhan Oblast, Russia

Coordinates: 46°20′N 48°12′E

Nachalovo (Russian: Нача́лово) is a rural locality (a selo) and the administrative center of Privolzhsky District of Astrakhan Oblast, Russia. Population: 5,451 (2010 census); 4,830 (2002 census); 3,922 (1989 Soviet census).
