= Privolzhsky District, Astrakhan Oblast =

Privolzhsky District Приволжский район (Russian)
- District
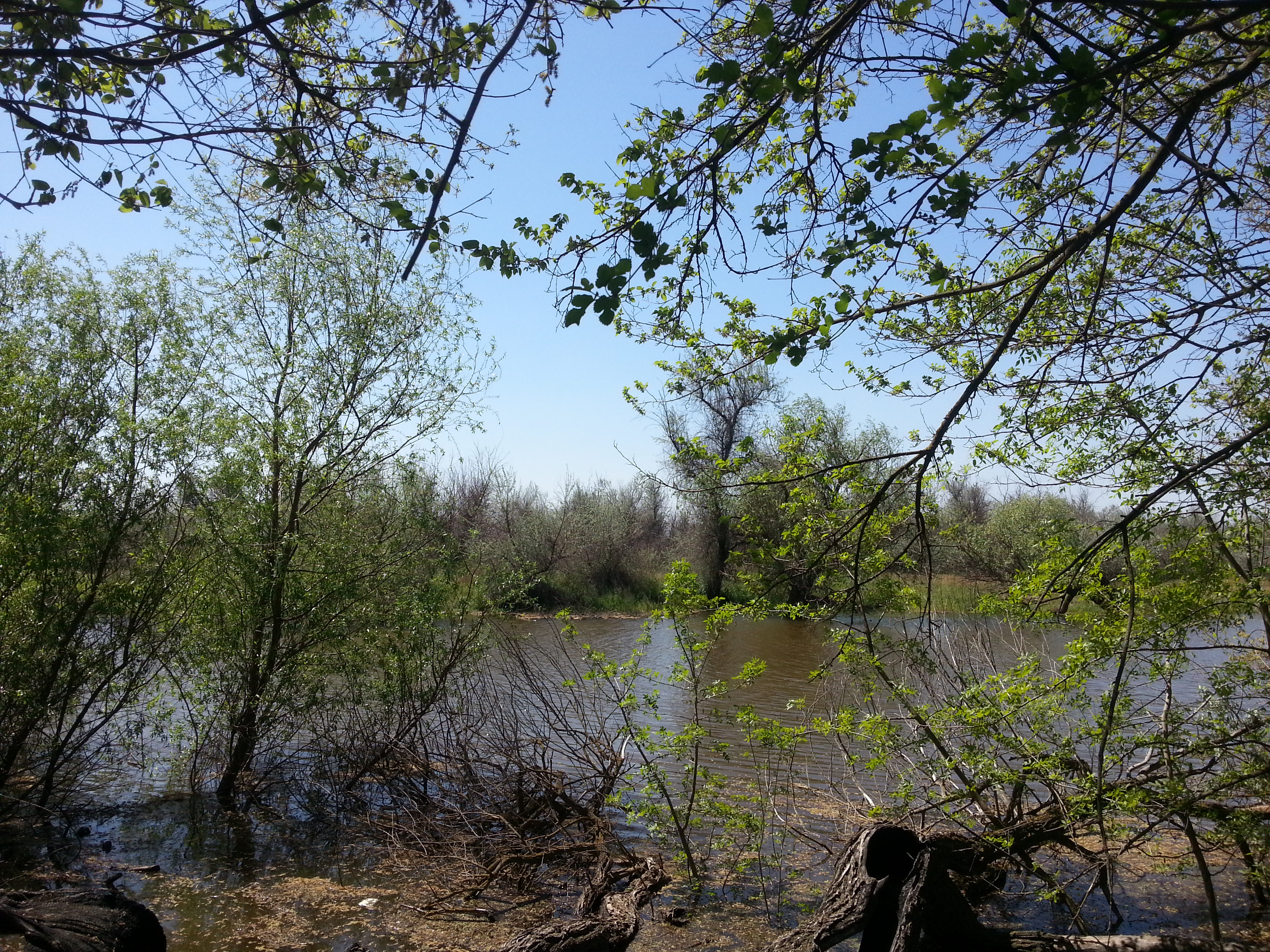
- Landscape in Privolzhsky District

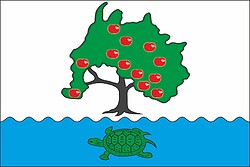
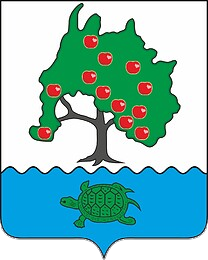
- Flag Coat of arms
- Location of Privolzhsky District in Astrakhan Oblast
- Coordinates: 46°20′38″N 48°10′34″E
- Country: Russia
- Federal subject: Astrakhan Oblast
- Established: 1980
- Administrative center: Nachalovo

Area
  - Total: 840.9 km^{2} (324.7 sq mi)

Population (2010 Census)
  - Total: 43,647
  - Density: 51.91/km^{2} (134.4/sq mi)
  - Urban: 0%
  - Rural: 100%

Administrative structure
  - Administrative divisions: 12 selsoviet
  - Inhabited localities: 39 rural localities

Municipal structure
  - Municipally incorporated as: Privolzhsky Municipal District
  - Municipal divisions: 0 urban settlements, 12 rural settlements
- Time zone: UTC+4 (MSK+1)
- OKTMO ID: 12642000
- Website: http://mo-priv.ru/

Privolzhsky District (Russian: Приво́лжский райо́н) is an administrative and municipal district (raion), one of the eleven in Astrakhan Oblast, Russia. It is located in the south of the oblast. The area of the district is 840.9 square kilometers (324.7 sq mi). Its administrative center is the rural locality (a selo) of Nachalovo. Population: 43,647 (2010 census); 38,649 (2002 Census); 38,575 (1989 Soviet census). The population of Nachalovo accounts for 12.5% of the district's total population.

Ethnic Russians are the biggest ethnic group in the district and make up around 39% of its population. Ethnic minorities include Tatars (30%), Kazakhs (16%) and Turkmens (4%).

== Geography ==
The entire district lies within the delta of the Volga River, although it is separated from the Caspian Sea by the Kamyzyaksky District.
