= Hushchyn =

Coordinates: 51°26′59″N 31°13′20″E

Hushchyn Гущин
- Village
- Interactive map of Hushchyn
- Country: Ukraine
- Oblast: Chernihiv Oblast
- Raion: Chernihiv Raion
- Hromada: Kyinka rural hromada

Area
  - Total: 0.369 km^{2} (0.142 sq mi)

Population (2022)
  - Total: 111
  - Density: 300.81/km^{2} (779.1/sq mi)
- Time zone: UTC+2 (EET)
  - Summer (DST): UTC+3 (EEST)

Hushchyn (Ukrainian: Гущин) is a village in Ukraine, in Kyinka rural hromada of Chernihiv Oblast, Chernihiv Raion, about 7 km from Chernihiv. The population is 111 people. Until 2018, the local self-government body was the Kyinsk Village Council. Hushchyn has been known as a farm since 1634, mentioned among the possessions of Chernihiv mayor Marcin Kalinowski.

Within the boundaries of the village of Hushchyv, on the ledge of the left bank of the Bilous River, opposite the village of Kyinka, there is a settlement on the north and west, bounded by the river valley, and on the southeast, fortified by a rampart and a ditch. There is a modern cemetery on the site.

== Geography ==
The Hushchyn is located in the center of Chernihiv raion, Gushchyn is located in the center of Chernihiv district, between Kyinka and Zhavynka. The territory of the village is located within the Dnieper Lowland, on the left bank of the Belous River, a tributary of the Desna River (Dnieper basin). The relief of the surface of the Hushchyn is a lowland plain, there are oxbow lake and artificial lakes in the floodplain of the river.

The climate of Hushchyn is moderately continental, with warm summers and relatively mild winters. The average temperature in January is about -7 °C, and in July - +19 °C. The average annual precipitation ranges from 550 to 660 mm, with the highest precipitation in the summer period.

The most common are sod-podzolic and gray forest soils. The Hushchyn is located in the natural zone of mixed forests, in Polissya. The main species in the forests are pine, oak, alder, ash, birch. Minerals – loam, peat, sand.

Regional highways pass near the village, but there is no railway connection.The nearest railway station is in the city of Chernihiv.
