= Dnieper basin =

Drainage basin

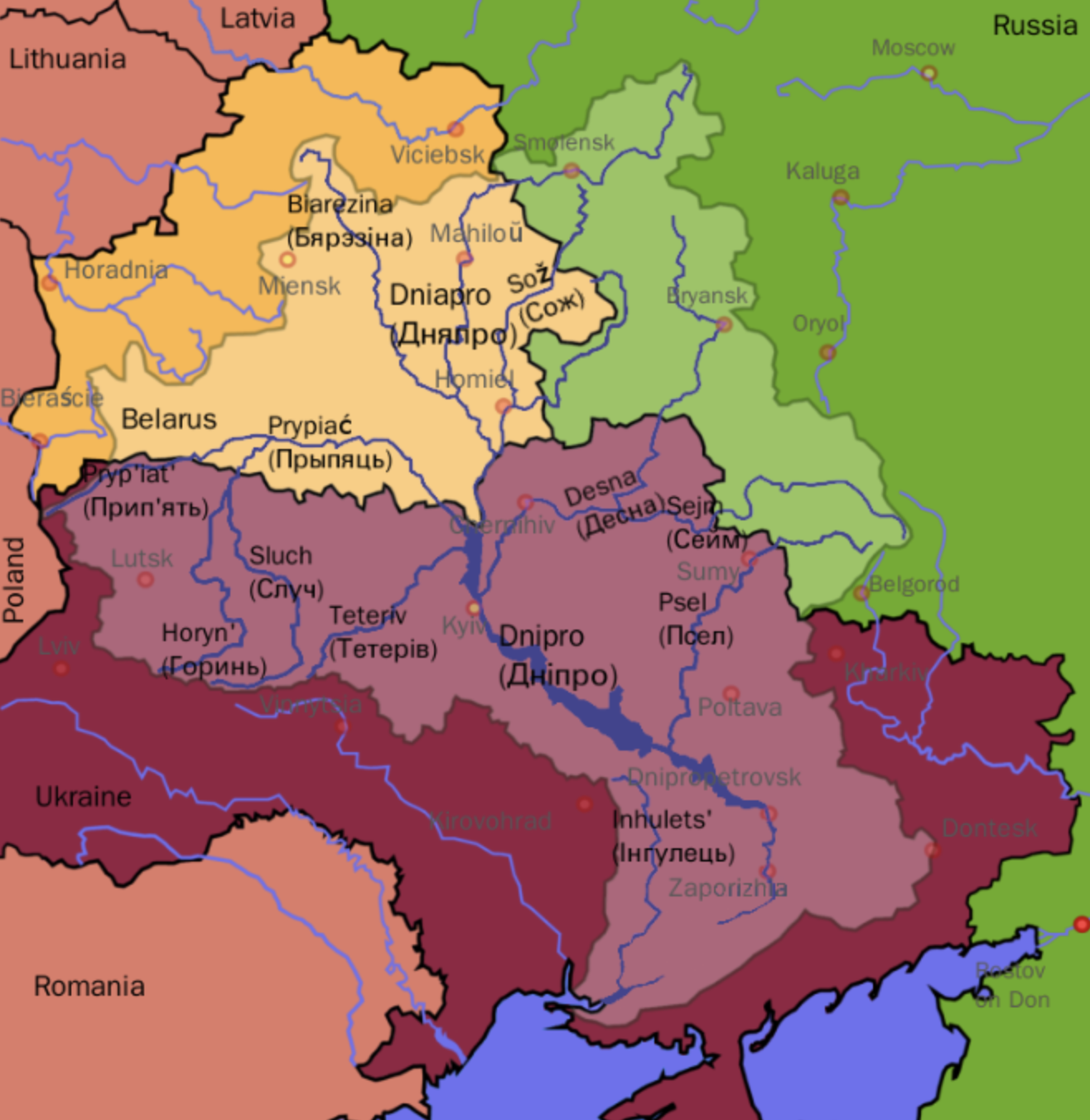
Dnieper River basin

The Dnieper Basin is the drainage basin of the Dnieper River, covering an area of 531,817 square kilometres (205,336 sq mi). Its water resources compose around 80% of the total for all Ukraine.

== Geography ==
The Dnieper Basin lies within Ukraine, Belarus, and Russia. It borders on the Volga Basin in the northeast, on the Donets River Basin in the east, which belongs to the Don River Basin, and in the southeast on several small watersheds, the watercourses of which flow in flow into the Sea of Azov. The southern edge of the watershed borders on other small watersheds whose rivers flow into the Black Sea. In the south of the catchment area, the main river Dnieper runs into a peak west of the city of Kherson and runs across the Dnieper–Bug estuary, where the stream flows into the Black Sea. In the southwest, the catchment area of the Dnieper borders on the Southern Bug Basin, which attaches laterally to the catchment area of the Dnieper. To the west is a small border with the Dniester Basin, as well as the Vistula Basin. In the northwest, the Dnieper River basin borders the Neman Basin and the Daugava Basin.

== Tributaries ==
The Dnieper has many tributaries (up to 32,000) with 89 being rivers with a length of at least 100 kilometres (62 mi). The main ones are, from its source to its mouth, with left (L) or right (R) bank indicated:

- Vyazma (L)
- Vop (R)
- Khmost (R)
- Myareya (L)
- Drut (R)
- Berezina (R)
- Sozh (L)
- Pripyat (R)
- Teteriv (R)
- Irpin (R)
- Desna (L)
- Stuhna (R)
- Trubizh (L)
- Ros (R)
- Tiasmyn (R)
- Supii (L)
- Sula (L)
- Psel (L)
- Vorskla (L)
- Oril (L)
- Samara (L)
- Konka (Kherson) (L)
- Konka (Zaporizhzhia) (L)
- Bilozerka (L)
- Bazavluk (R)
- Inhulets (R)

The most prominent rivers in the catchment area are Dnieper with a length of 2,201 kilometres (1,368 mi) and Desna, with a length of 1,130 kilometres (700 mi).

Many small direct tributaries also exist, such as, in the Kyiv area, the Syrets (right bank) in the north of the city, the historically significant Lybid (right bank) passing west of the centre, and the Borshahivka (right bank) to the south.
