= Kyinka rural hromada =

Kyinka rural hromada Киїнська сільська громада
- Hromada
- Interactive map of Kyinka rural hromada
- Country: Ukraine
- Oblast: Chernihiv
- Raion: Chernihiv

Area
  - Total: 108.2 km^{2} (41.8 sq mi)

Population (2020)
  - Total: 4,684
  - Density: 43.29/km^{2} (112.1/sq mi)
- CATOTTG code: UA74100130000039404
- Settlements: 6
- Villages: 6
- Website: kyinska-gromada.gov.ua

Kyinka rural hromada (Ukrainian: Киїнська сільська громада) is a hromada of Ukraine, located in Chernihiv Raion, Chernihiv Oblast. Its administrative center is the village of Kyinka.The Kyinka rural hromada is located within the Dnieper Lowland, on the left bank of the Desna River (Dnieper basin). It has an area of 108.2 square kilometres (41.8 mi^{2}) and a population of 4,684, as of 2020.

== Composition ==
The hromada contains 6 settlements, which are all villages:

- Hushchyn
- Zhavynka
- Kyinka
- Pavlivka
- Trisvyatska Sloboda
- Shestovitsa

== Geography ==
The Kyinka rural hromada is located in the center of Chernihiv raion, bordering the city of Chernihiv in the northeast.The territory of the hromada is located within the Dnieper Lowland, on the left bank of the Desna River (Dnieper basin). The relief of the surface of the Kyinka rural hromada is a lowland plain, there are oxbow lake and artificial lakes in the floodplain of the river.

The climate of Kyinka rural hromada is moderately continental, with warm summers and relatively mild winters. The average temperature in January is about -7°C, and in July - +19°C. The average annual precipitation ranges from 550 to 660 mm, with the highest precipitation in the summer period.

The most common are sod-podzolic and gray forest soils. The Kyinka rural hromada is located in the natural zone of mixed forests, in Polissya. The main species in the forests are pine, oak, alder, ash, birch. Minerals – loam, peat, sand.

Regional highways pass through the district, there is no railway connection. The nearest railway station is in the city of Chernihiv.

Near the village of Shestovitsa, not far from the Desna River, is the "Shestovitsa Archaeological Complex", consisting of a settlement and two 10th-century burial mounds.

== See also ==
- List of hromadas of Ukraine
