= Kyinka =

Coordinates: 51°27′34″N 31°11′38″E

Kyinka Киїнка
- Village
- Interactive map of Kyinka
- Country: Ukraine
- Oblast: Chernihiv Oblast
- Raion: Chernihiv Raion
- Hromada: Kyinka rural hromada

Area
  - Total: 2.533 km^{2} (0.978 sq mi)

Population (2022)
  - Total: 2,552
  - Density: 1,007.5/km^{2} (2,609/sq mi)
- Time zone: UTC+2 (EET)
  - Summer (DST): UTC+3 (EEST)

Kiynka (Ukrainian: Киїнка) is a village in Ukraine, the center of Kyinka rural hromada, Chernihiv Oblast, Chernihiv Raion. It is located at a distance of 1 km from Chernihiv. Until 2016, the local self-government body was the Kyinka Village Council, to which, in addition to Kyinka, were subordinated villages Hushchyn and Zhawynka.

During the 2022 siege of Chernihiv, Russian military forces were unable to enter Kyinka, but the village was constantly shelled from the directions of Mykhailo-Kotsiubynske and Shestovytsia, resulting in damage to over a thousand houses.

== Geography ==
The name of the village comes from the Kiyanka River, a right tributary of the Bilous River (Desna basin). The Kyinka is located in the center of Chernihiv raion, bordering the city of Chernihiv in the northeast.The territory of the village is located within the Dnieper Lowland, on the left bank of the Desna River (Dnieper basin). The relief of the surface of the Kyinka is a lowland plain, there are oxbow lake and artificial lakes in the floodplain of the river.

The climate of Kyinka is moderately continental, with warm summers and relatively mild winters. The average temperature in January is about -7 °C, and in July - +19 °C. The average annual precipitation ranges from 550 to 660 mm, with the highest precipitation in the summer period.

The most common are sod-podzolic and gray forest soils. The Kyinka is located in the natural zone of mixed forests, in Polissya. The main species in the forests are pine, oak, alder, ash, birch. Minerals – loam, peat, sand.

Regional highways pass near the village, but there is no railway connection.The nearest railway station is in the city of Chernihiv.
