= Zhavynka =

Coordinates: 51°26′35″N 31°15′07″E

Zhavynka Жавинка
- Village
- Interactive map of Zhavynka
- Country: Ukraine
- Oblast: Chernihiv Oblast
- Raion: Chernihiv Raion
- Hromada: Kyinka rural hromada

Area
  - Total: 0.788 km^{2} (0.304 sq mi)

Population (2022)
  - Total: 549
  - Density: 696.7/km^{2} (1,804/sq mi)
- Time zone: UTC+2 (EET)
  - Summer (DST): UTC+3 (EEST)

Zhavynka (Ukrainian: Жавинка) is a village in Ukraine, in Kyinka rural hromada of Chernihiv Oblast, Chernihiv Raion. It is located at a distance of about 7 km from Chernihiv. The Zhavynka is located within the Dnieper Lowland, on the left bank of the Desna River (Dnieper basin). The population is 549 people. Until 2016, the local self-government body was the Kyinsk Village Council.

== History ==
From 1638 to 1710, the village was called "Zholvinka" in documents, and later and until 1943 — "Zholvinka". After the war, the name began to be indicated as "Zhavynka" without an official renaming. From 1638 to 1710, the village was called "Zholvinka" in documents, and later and until 1943 — "Zholvinka". After the war, the name began to be indicated as "Zhavynka" without an official renaming.

The village is home to the first licensed craft winery in the North of Ukraine, LLC "Vinoman".

== Geography ==
The Zhavynka is located in the center of Chernihiv raion, southwest of the city of Chernihiv. The territory of the village is located within the Dnieper Lowland, on the left bank of the Desna River (Dnieper basin). The relief of the surface of the Zhavynka is a lowland plain, there are oxbow lake and artificial lakes in the floodplain of the river.

The climate of Zhavynka is moderately continental, with warm summers and relatively mild winters. The average temperature in January is about -7 °C, and in July - +19 °C. The average annual precipitation ranges from 550 to 660 mm, with the highest precipitation in the summer period.

The most common are sod-podzolic and gray forest soils. The Zhavynka is located in the natural zone of mixed forests, in Polissya. The main species in the forests are pine, oak, alder, ash, birch. Minerals – loam, peat, sand.

Regional highways pass near the village, but there is no railway connection.The nearest railway station is in the city of Chernihiv.

== Famous people ==
- Petro Leontiyovych Kolomiets ( ukr. —Петро Леонтійович Коломієць, rus. —Пётр Леонтьевич Коломиец) — Soviet officer was born in the village, Hero of the Soviet Union, during the Eastern Front in World War II squadron commander of the 2nd Guards Fighter Aviation Regiment 6th Fighter Aviation Division of the Northern Fleet Air Forces (pilot in the USSR Navy), Guard Captain.

== Gallery ==
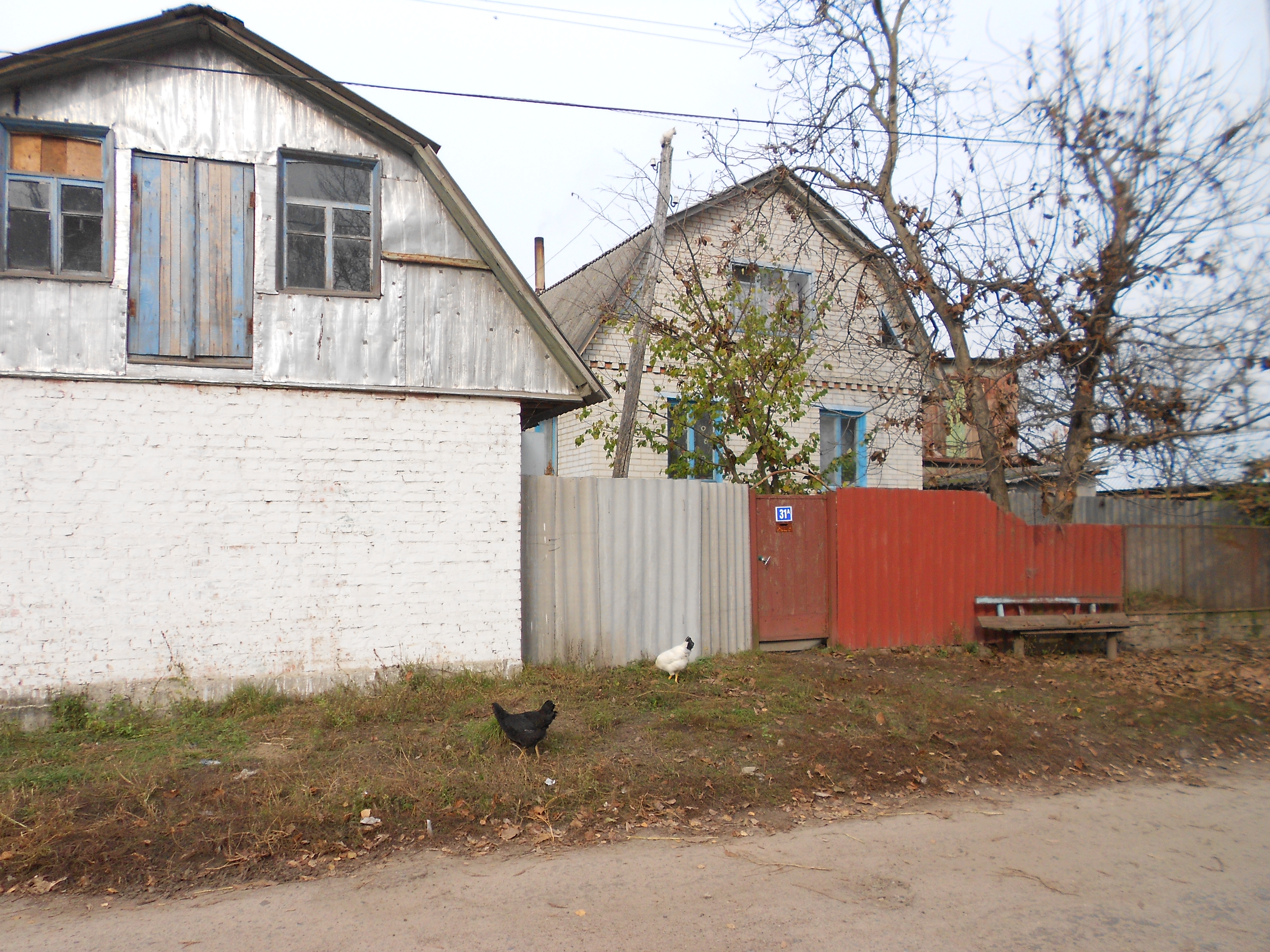
Village street

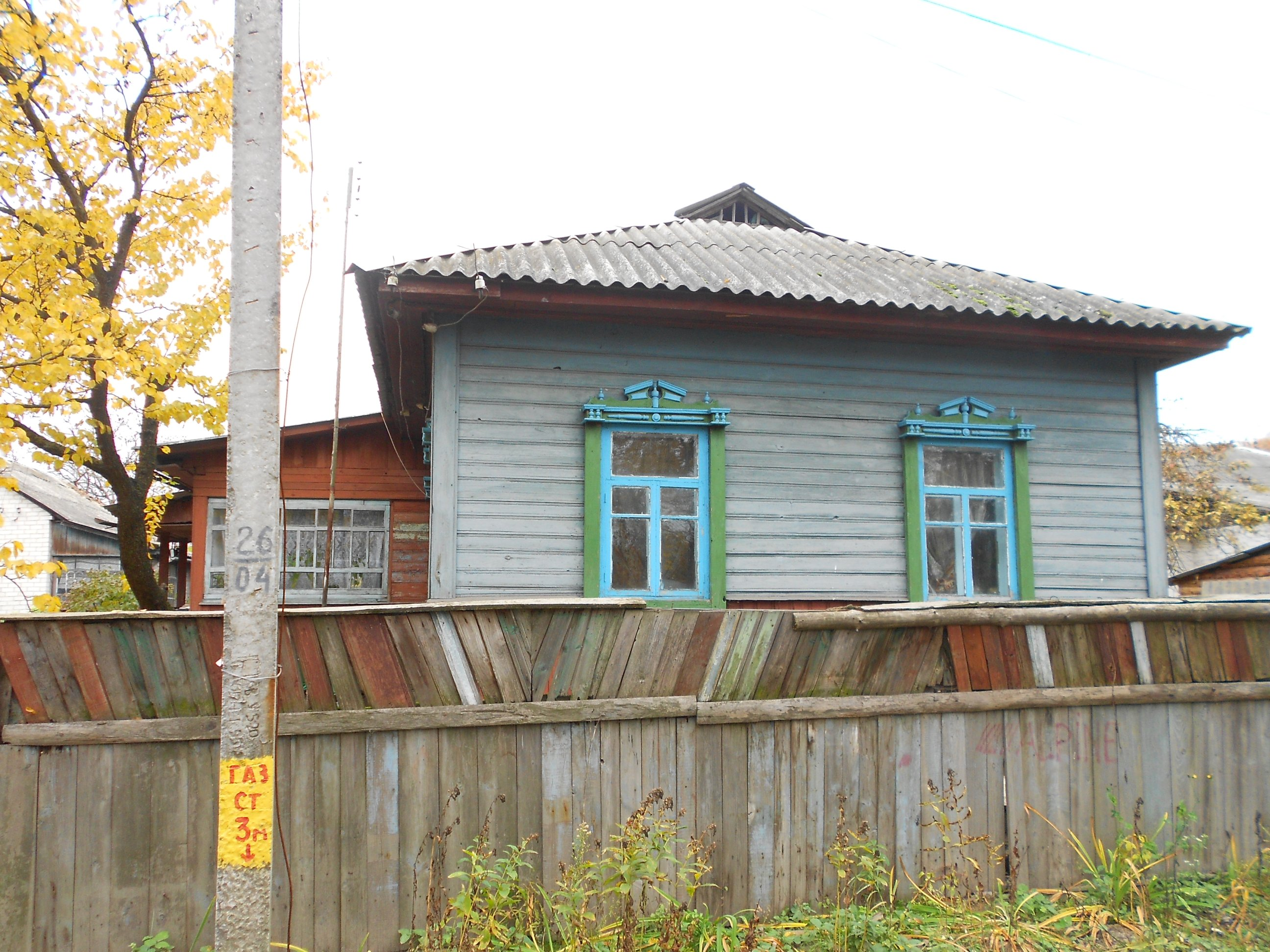
House

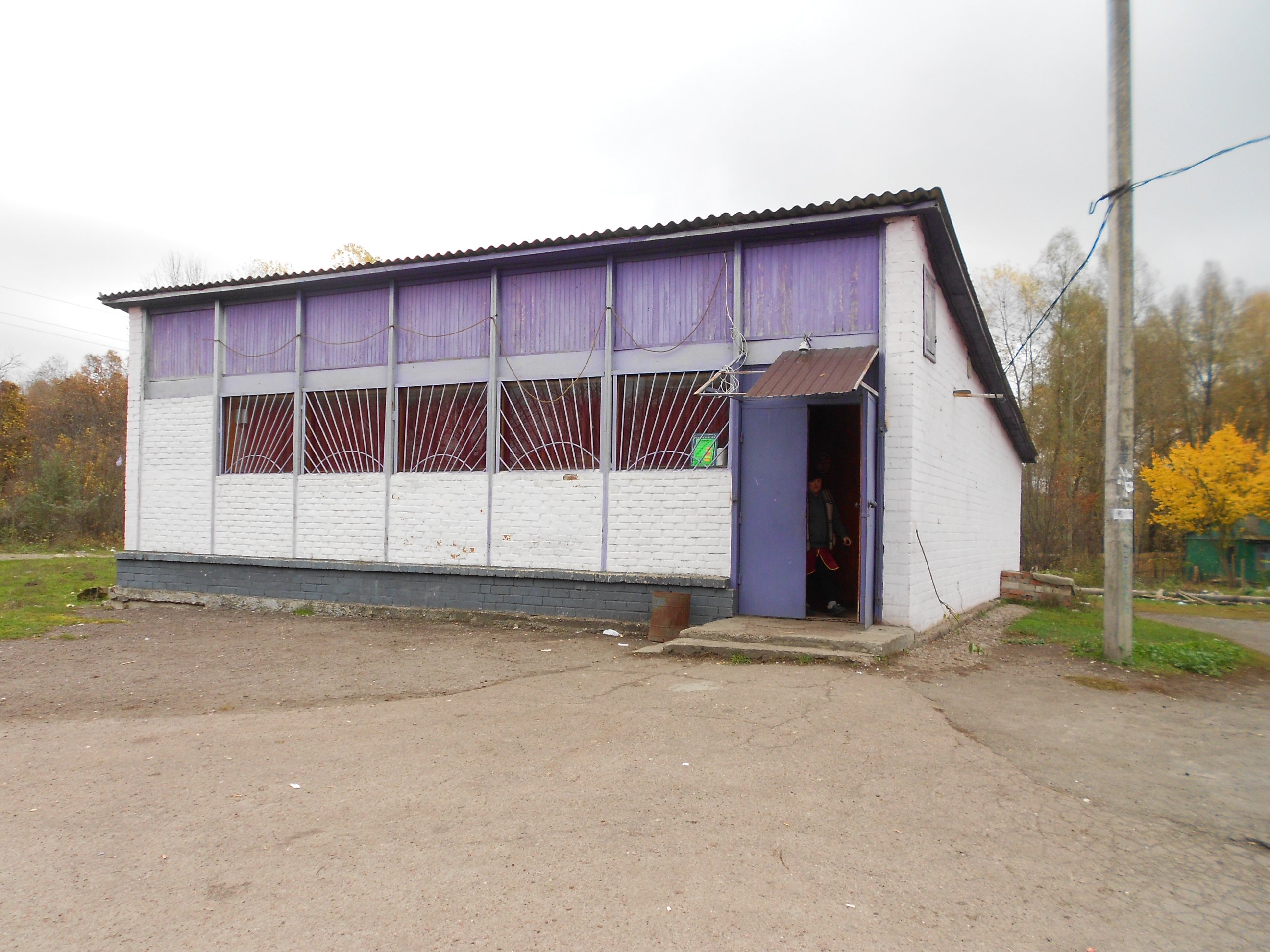
Shop

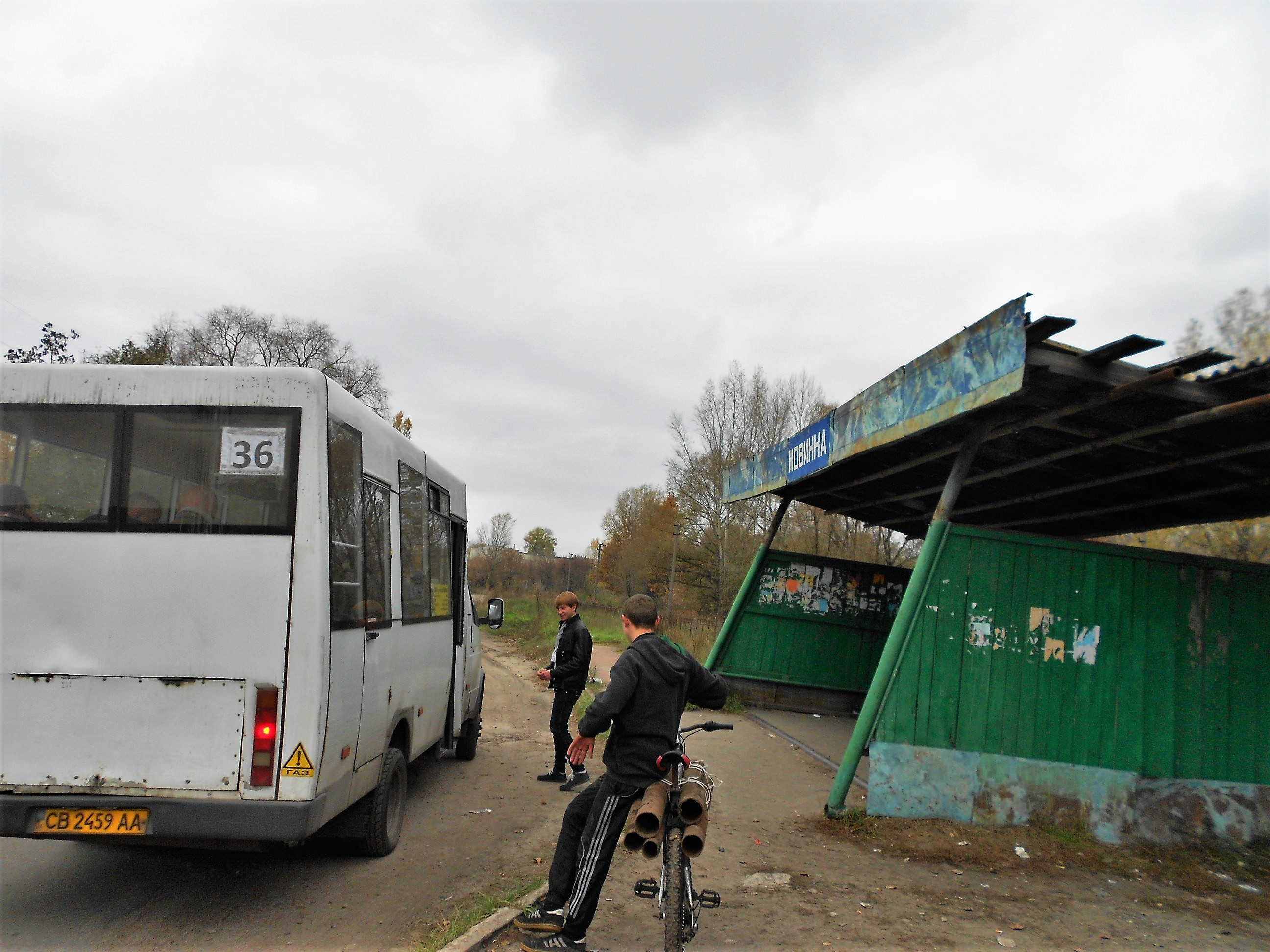
Bus stop

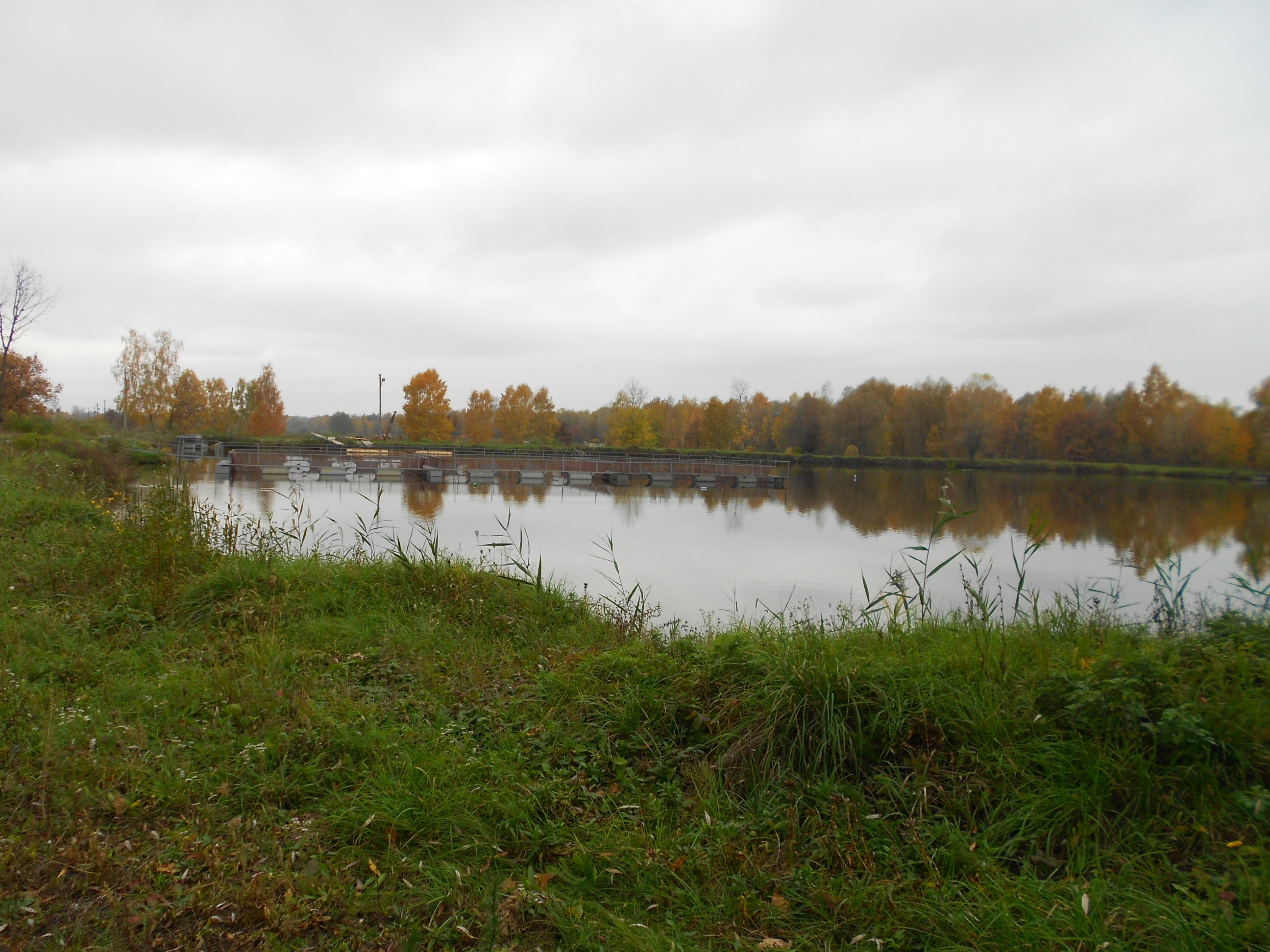
Sump

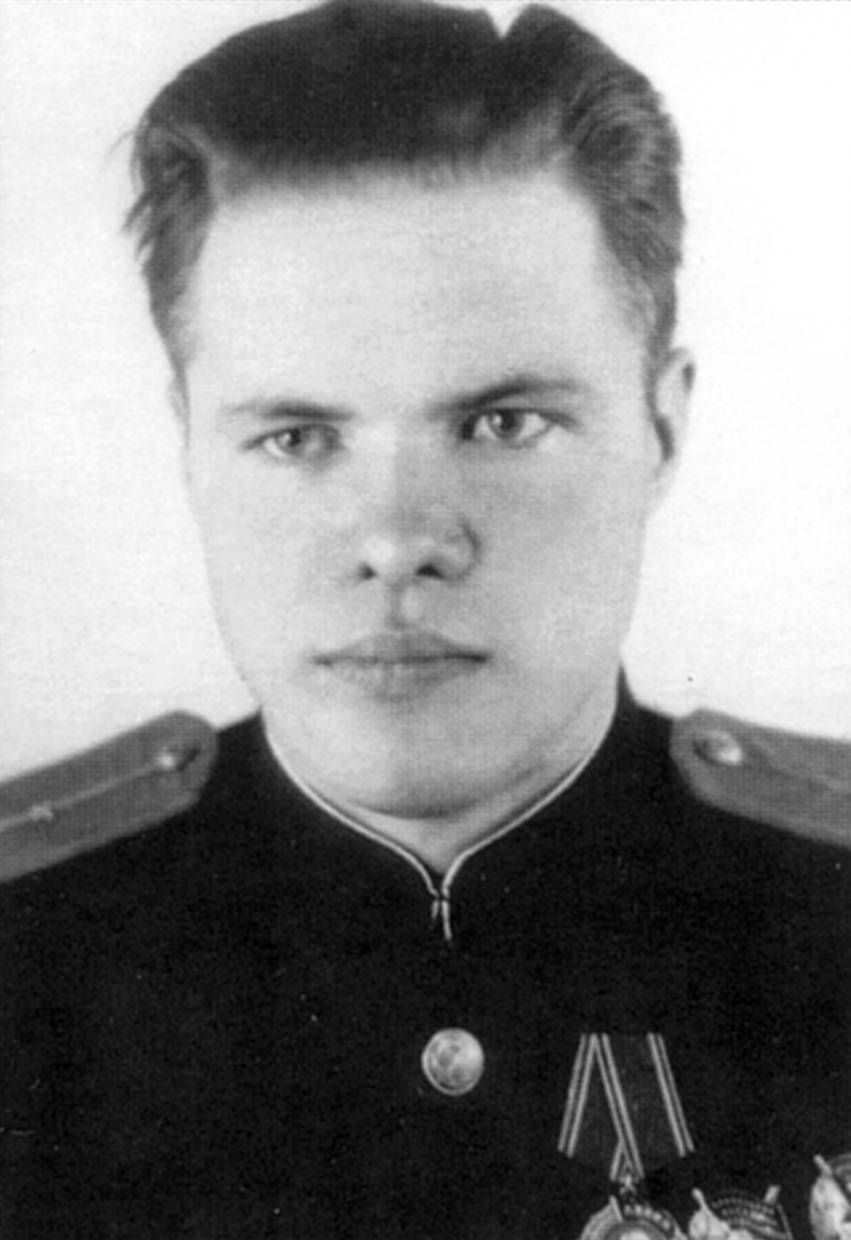
Petro Leontiyovych Kolomiets - Hero of the Soviet Union ( see the famous people section )
