= Bilozerka (river) =

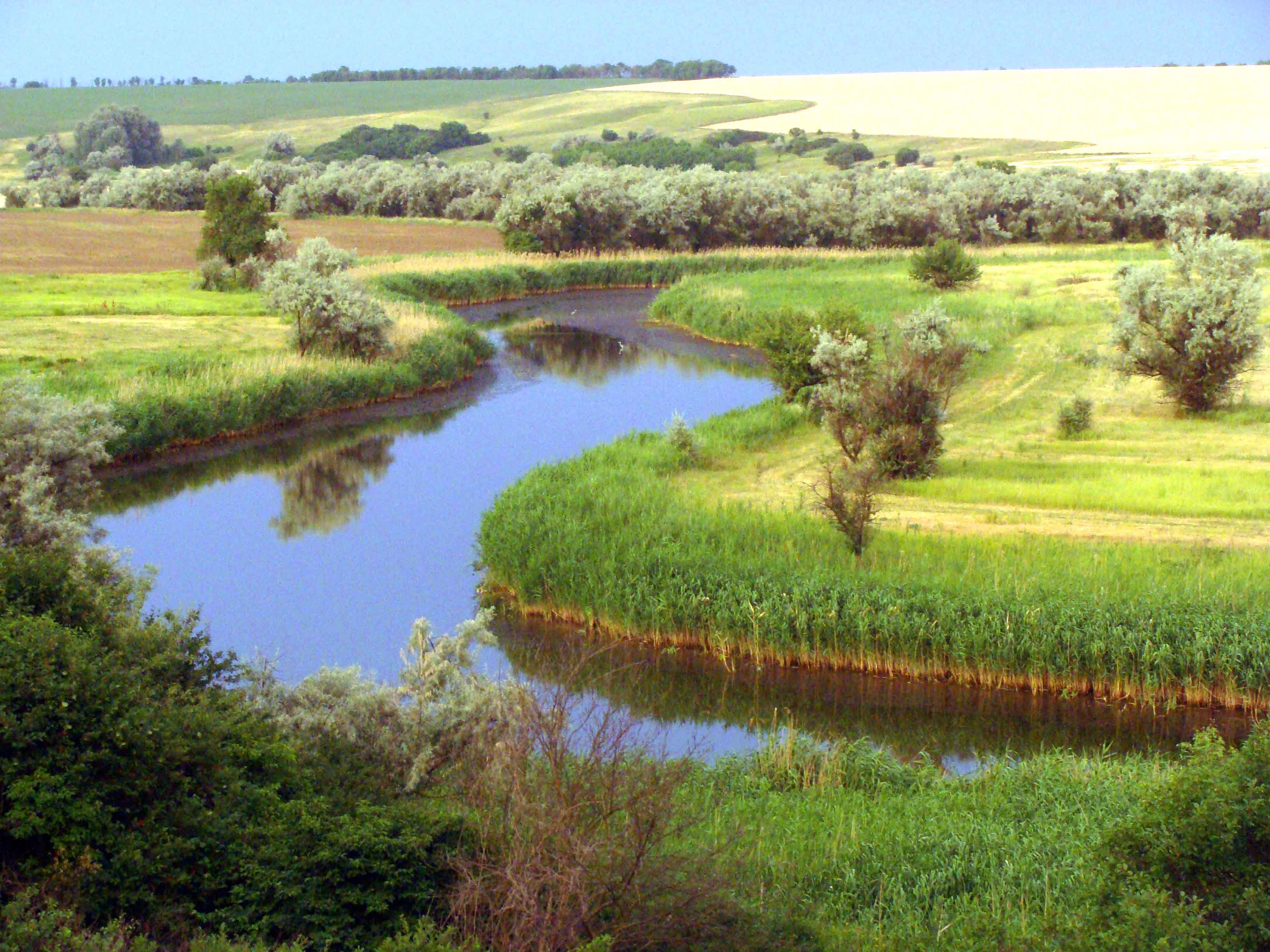

Location
- Country: Ukraine

Physical characteristics
- Source
  - location: Zaporizhia Oblast
- Mouth
  - location: Dnieper
  - coordinates: 47.4275°N 34.4148°E
- Length: 84.8 km (52.7 mi)
- Basin size: 1,401 km^{2} (541 sq mi)

Basin features
- Progression: Dnieper→ Dnieper–Bug estuary→ Black Sea

The Bilozerka (Ukrainian: Білозерка) is a river in Ukraine, 84.8 km in length, a left tributary of the Dnieper. The Bilozerka finds its source in the village of Mala Bilozerka, Vasylivka Raion, Zaporizhia Oblast.

== Cities and towns ==
- Kamianka-Dniprovska
