= Konka (Kherson Oblast) =

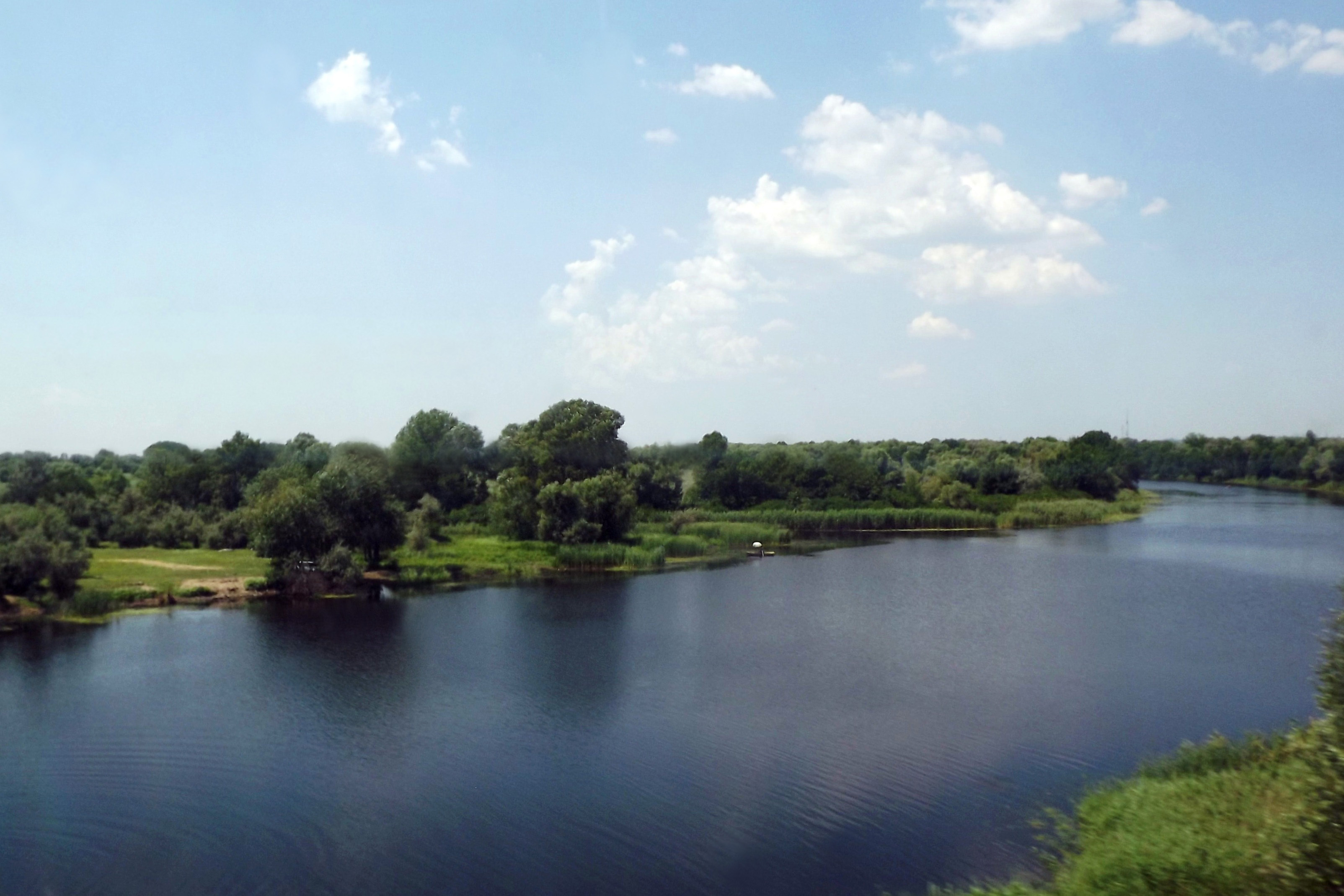

Location
- Country: Ukraine
- Oblast: Kherson Oblast

Physical characteristics
- Source
  - location: Near Prydniprovske
  - coordinates: 47°19′48″N 36°26′46″E
- Mouth: Dnieper
  - coordinates: 46°29′36″N 32°18′23″E

Basin features
- Progression: Dnieper→ Dnieper–Bug estuary→ Black Sea

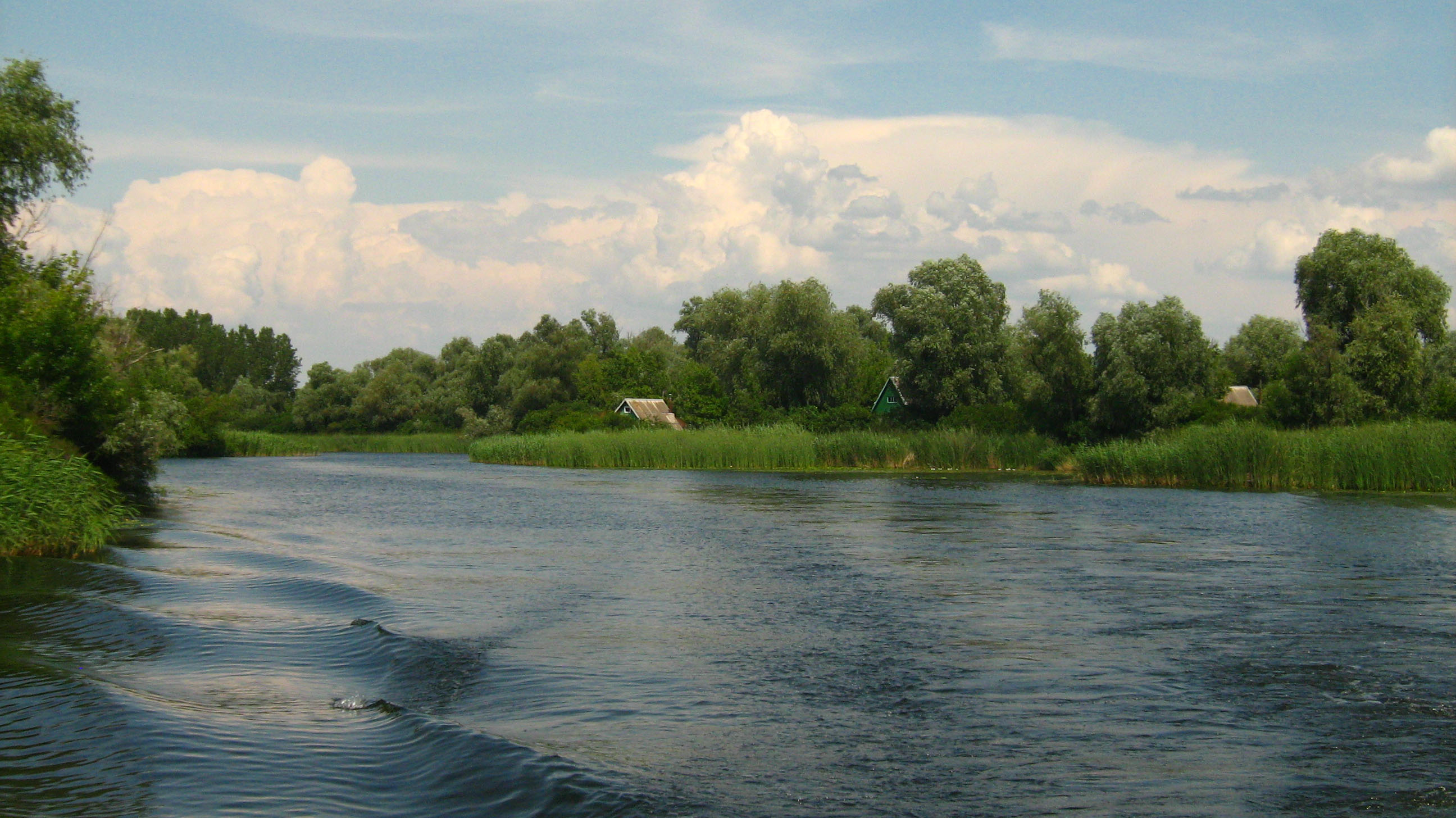
View of the Konka near Hola Prystan

The Konka (Ukrainian: Конка) is a left tributary of the Dnieper, flowing through Kherson Oblast. Much of the river runs parallel to the Dnipro in its south. It originates near the town of Prydniprovske, through the cities of Oleshky and Hola Prystan before confluencing with the Dnipro.

== History ==
It is assumed that the river was part of the Herros-Hypakyris water system as described by Herodotus in the fifth century BC. Yurii Bezukh postulates this in "Herodotus' Herros", where he equates Konka and Kalanchak River with the Herros, when Herodotus wrote about several rivers in Histories (Book IV) flowing into the Black Sea from Scythia, which is assumed based on its flow into the Karkinitsky Bay of the Black Sea according to his books.

The construction of the Kakhovka Reservoir submerged many parts of the Konka, regulating and diminishing its ecological and hydrological functions. Prior to this, 1943 maps during the Soviet times showed sandy elevation acting as a divide between Konka's main source and its temporary tributary, Kuschugum, which only functioned as a riverbed during high waters. The ridges became known as "Kuchugury", and after the Kakhovka Reservoir, they appeared as vegetated islands above the water source.

=== Role in Russo-Ukrainian War ===
During the Russo-Ukrainian War, the Dnipro River became a frontline after the Ukrainian forces completed the Liberation of Kherson . In late October 2023, there were visual evidences that Ukrainian troops successfully crossed the Dnipro and gained some presence around the Konka River.

== Settlements ==
- Oleshky, Khersion Raion
- Bilohrudove, Skadovsk Raion
- Hola Prystan, Skadovsk Raion
