= Dnieper =

Major river in Eastern Europe

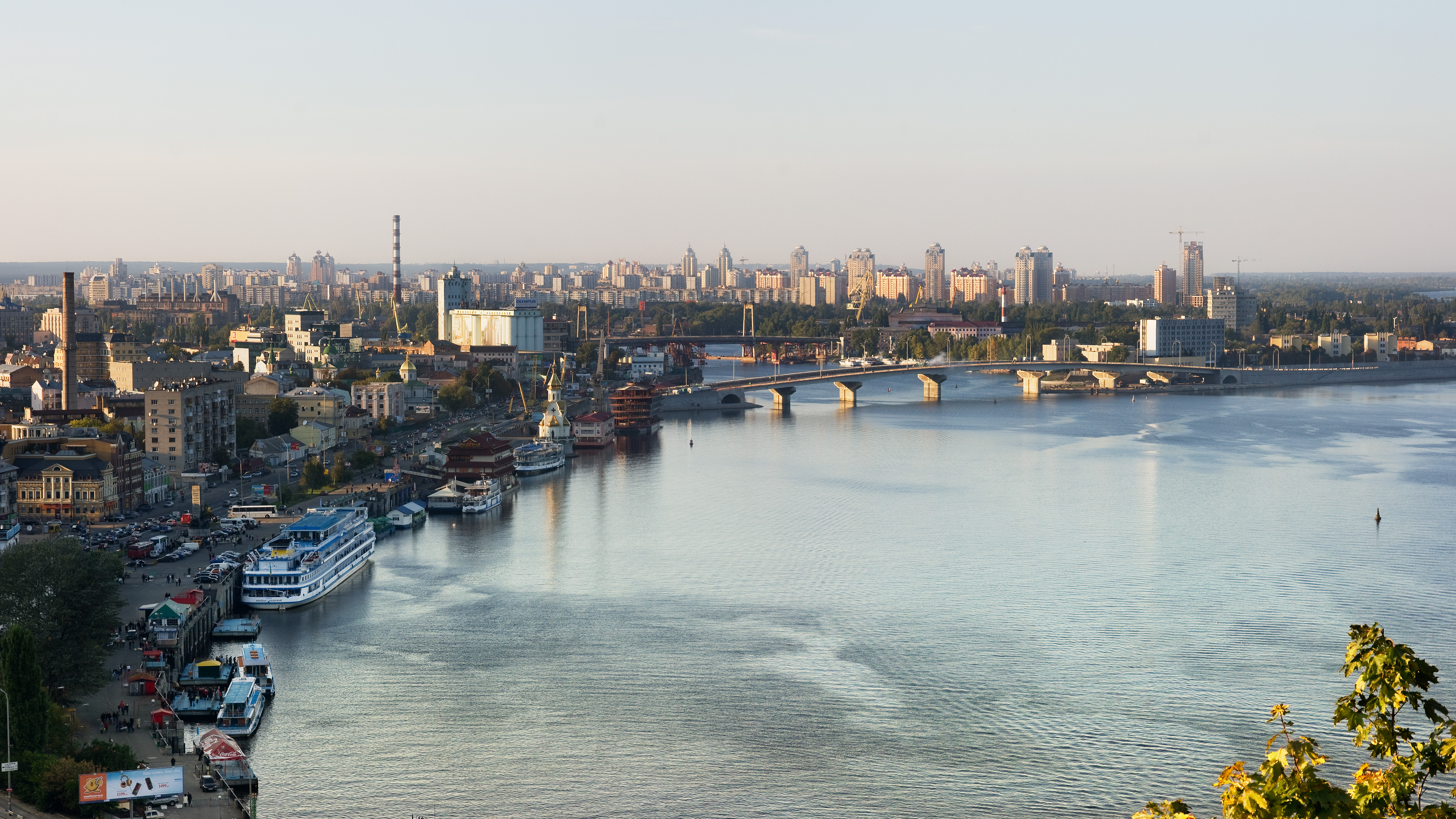
- Dnieper in Kyiv

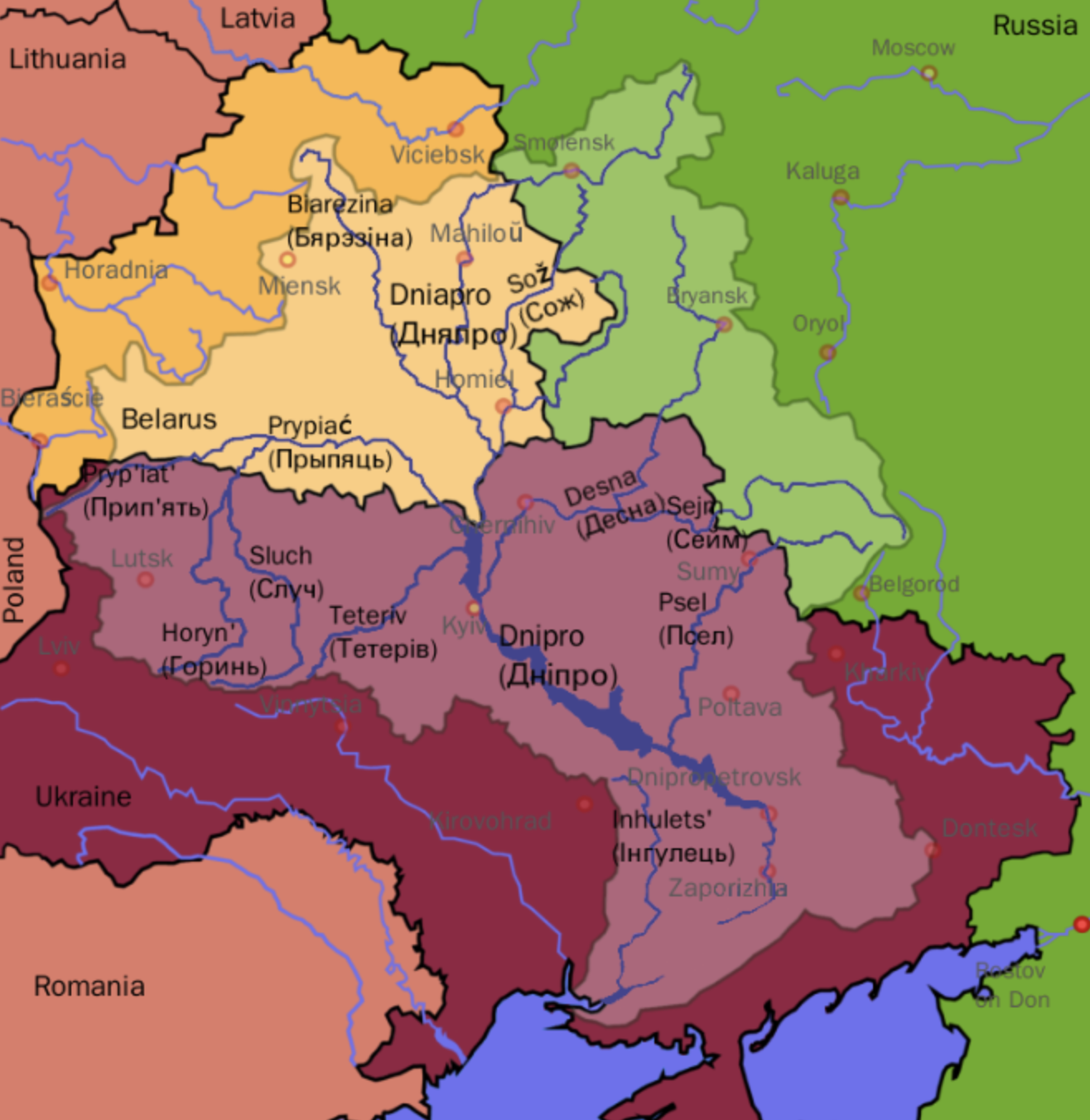
- Dnieper River drainage basin (lighter tones)
- Native name: Днепр (Russian); Дняпро (Belarusian); Дніпро (Ukrainian)

Location
- Countries: Russia; Belarus; Ukraine
- Cities: Dorogobuzh; Smolensk; Mogilev; Kyiv; Cherkasy; Dnipro; Zaporizhzhia; Kherson

Physical characteristics
- Source
  - location: Valdai Hills, Russia
  - coordinates: 55°52′18.08″N 33°43′27.08″E
  - elevation: 220 m (720 ft)
- Mouth: Dnieper Delta
  - location: Ukraine
  - coordinates: 46°30′00″N 32°20′00″E
  - elevation: 0 m (0 ft)
- Length: 2,201 km (1,368 mi)
- Basin size: 504,000 km^{2} (195,000 sq mi)
- Discharge
  - location: Kherson
  - average: 1,670 m^{3}/s (59,000 cu ft/s)

Basin features
- Tributaries
  - left: Sozh, Desna, Trubizh, Supiy, Sula, Psel, Vorskla, Samara, Konka (Kherson Oblast), Konka (Zaporizhzhia Oblast), Bilozerka
  - right: Drut, Berezina, Pripyat, Teteriv, Irpin, Stuhna, Ros, Tiasmyn, Bazavluk, Inhulets
- Protection status

Ramsar Wetland
- Official name: Dnieper River Floodplain
- Designated: 29 May 2014
- Reference no.: 2244

The Dnieper or Dnepr (/(də)ˈniːpər/ (də-)NEE-pər), (Note: Russian: Днепр, romanized: Dnepr, pronounced [dnʲepr]; Belarusian: Днепр, romanized: Dniepr, pronounced [dnʲɛpr].) also known as the Dnipro (/(də)ˈniːproʊ/ (də-)NEE-proh), (Note: Ukrainian: Дніпро, romanized: Dnipro, pronounced [d⁽ʲ⁾n⁽ʲ⁾iˈprɔ]; Belarusian: Дняпро, romanized: Dniapro, pronounced [dnʲaˈprɔ].) is one of the major transboundary rivers of Europe, rising in the Valdai Hills near Smolensk, Russia, before flowing through Belarus and Ukraine to the Black Sea. Approximately 2,200 km (1,400 mi) long, with a drainage basin of 504,000 square kilometres (195,000 mi^{2}), it is the longest river of Ukraine and Belarus and the fourth-longest river in Europe, after the Volga, Danube, and Ural rivers.

In antiquity, the river was part of the Amber Road trade routes. During the Ruin in the later 17th century, the area was contested between the Polish–Lithuanian Commonwealth and the Russian Empire, dividing what is now Ukraine into areas described by its right and left banks. During the Soviet period, the river became noted for its major hydroelectric dams and large reservoirs. The 1986 Chernobyl disaster occurred on the Pripyat River, a tributary of the Dnieper, just upstream from its confluence with the Dnieper. The Dnieper is an important navigable waterway for the economy of Ukraine and is connected by the Dnieper–Bug Canal to other waterways in Europe. During the 2022 Russian invasion of Ukraine, certain segments of the river were made part of the defensive lines between territory controlled by the Russians and the Ukrainians.

== Names ==
=== Dnieper ===
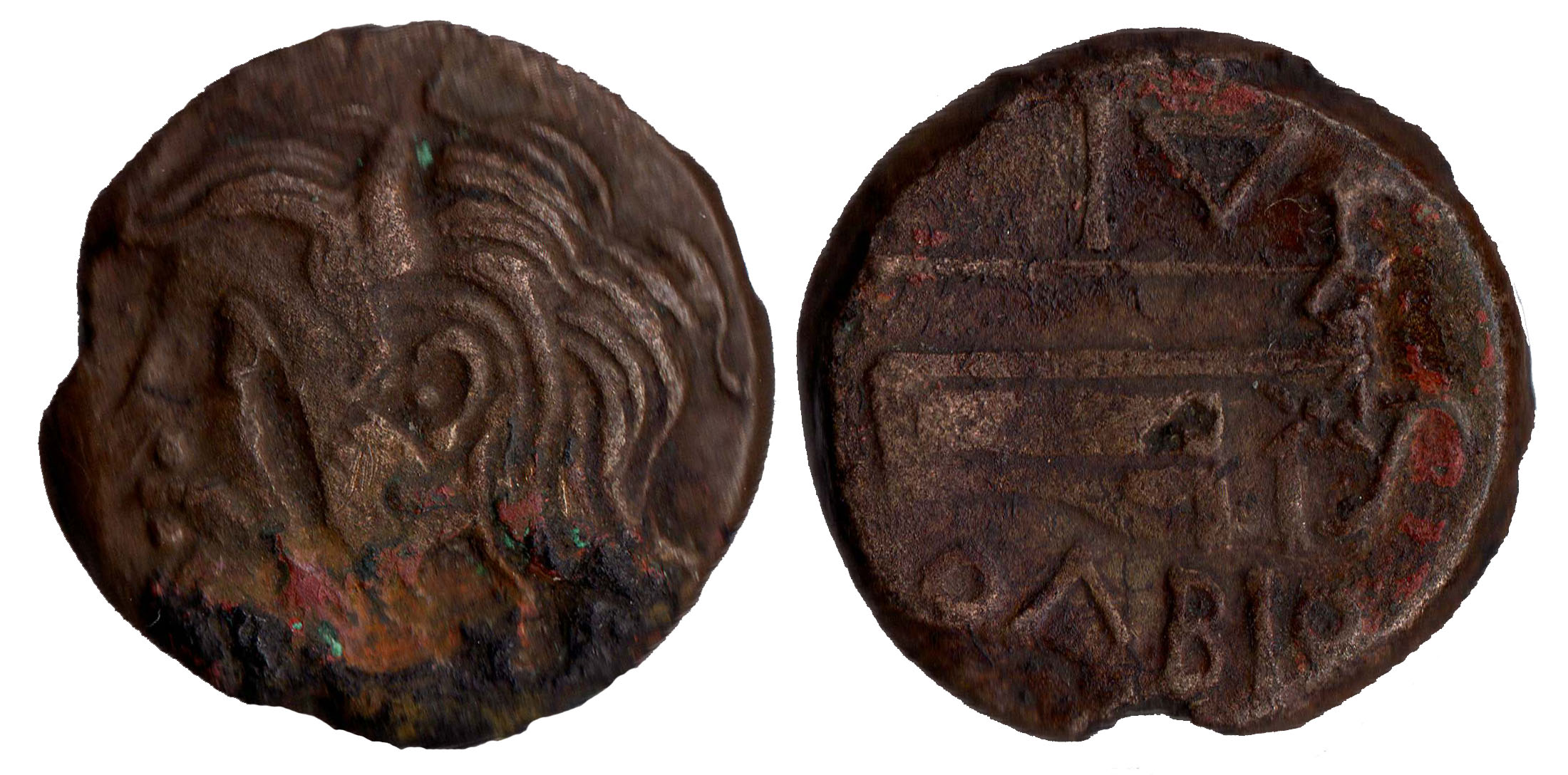
Human representation of the Dnieper river (known as Borysthenes) on an Ancient Greek coin of Pontic Olbia, 4th–3rd century BC

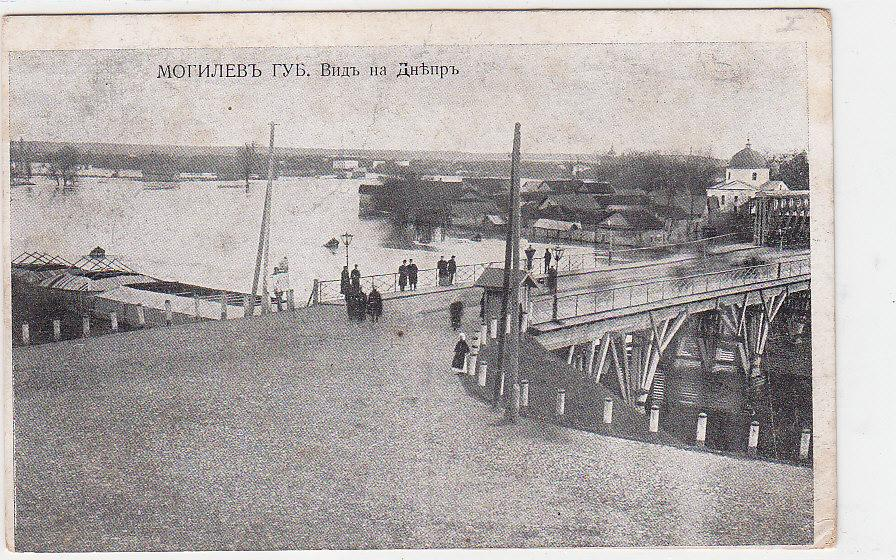
Pre-1918 photo with the old spelling of Dnieper (Днѣпръ)

The river is also sometimes called by the Russian name Dnepr (Днепр, pre-revolutionary spelling Днѣпръ, Dněpr). The initial D in Dnieper is generally silent when pronounced in English, although it may be sounded: /ˈniːpər/ or /dəˈniːpər/.

Dnipro derives from Ukrainian: Дніпро, romanized: Dnipro. The English pronunciation is /dəˈniːproʊ/. The Ukrainian name has a rare form Дніпр, Dnipr and rare dialectal Дніпер, Dniper. The Middle Ukrainian form attested in the 16th to 18th centuries was Днѣпръ, Dnǐpr. The city of Dnipro is named for the river.

In Belarusian, the river is called Дняпро, Dniapro, or Днепр, Dniepr.

These names are all cognate, deriving from Old East Slavic Дънѣпръ (Dŭněprŭ). The origin of this name is disputed but generally derived from either Sarmatian *Dānu Apara ("Farther River") in parallel with the Dniester ("Nearer River") or from Scythian *Dānu Apr ("Deep River") in reference to its lack of fords, from which was also derived the Late Antique name of the river, Δάναπρις Danapris, as found in the Ravenna Cosmography.

=== Borysthenes ===
The earlier Graeco-Roman name of the river, as attested by Herodotus, was "Borysthenes" (Ancient Greek: Βορυσθένης, romanized: Borusthénēs; Latin: Borysthenes, Ukrainian: Бористен, Борисфен, romanized: Borysten, Borysfen) and later Δάναπρις Danapris. The name Borysthenes was derived from a Scythian name whose form was:

- either Baurastāna, meaning "yellow place",
- or Baurustāna meant "place of beavers".
  - This name was linked to the mantle of beaver skins worn by the Iranic water goddess Arəduuī Sūrā Anāhitā, whose epithet of āp (Avestan: 𐬁𐬞, lit. 'water') was connected to the name of the daughter of the river-god Borysthenēs in Scythian mythology, the Earth-and-Water goddess Api, whose own name meant "water".

Ovid used Borysthenius, an adjective derived from Borysthenes, as the river's poetic Latin name.

=== Var ===
The Huns' name for the river, Var, was derived from Scythian *Varu, meaning "Broad". This name was connected to the Graeco-Roman name of the Volga river, Oarus (Ancient Greek: Ὄαρος, romanized: Óaros; Latin: Oarus), which was also derived from Scythian *Varu.

=== Other names ===
In Ukrainian it is also known poetically as Славутич, Slavutych or Славута, Slavuta, from an old name used in Kievan Rus'. This is due to the influence of the Old East Slavic epic The Tale of Igor's Campaign and its modern adaptations on Ukrainian literature. This usage also lent its name to the city of Slavutych, founded in the wake of the Chernobyl disaster in 1986 to house displaced workers, and to the Slavutych station of the Kyiv Metro.

In Crimean Tatar, the river is known as Özü. In Turkish it is Özü or Özi (Ottoman Turkish: اوزی), which was derived from Ochakiv.

== Geography ==
The total length of the river is variously given as 2,145 kilometres (1,333 mi) or 2,201 km (1,368 mi), of which 485 km (301 mi) are within Russia, 700 km (430 mi) are within Belarus, and 1,095 km (680 mi) are within Ukraine. Its basin covers 504,000 square kilometres (195,000 mi^{2}), of which 289,000 km^{2} (112,000 mi^{2}) are within Ukraine, 118,360 km^{2} (45,700 mi^{2}) are within Belarus.

The source of the Dnieper is the sedge bogs (Akseninsky Mokh) of the Valdai Hills in central Russia, at an elevation of 220 m (720 ft). For 115 km (71 mi) of its length, it serves as the border between Belarus and Ukraine. Its estuary, or liman, used to be defended by the strong fortress of Ochakiv.

The southernmost point in Belarus is on the Dnieper to the south of Kamaryn in Brahin Raion.

=== Tributaries ===
The Dnieper has as many as 32,000 tributaries, with 89 being rivers greater than 100 kilometres (62 mi) in length. The main tributaries are, from its source to its mouth, with left (L) or right (R) bank indicated:

- Vyazma (L)
- Vop (R)
- Khmost (R)
- Myareya (L)
- Drut (R)
- Berezina (R)
- Sozh (L)
- Pripyat (R)
- Teteriv (R)
- Irpin (R)
- Desna (L)
- Stuhna (R)
- Trubizh (L)
- Ros (R)
- Tiasmyn (R)
- Supii (L)
- Sula (L)
- Psel (L)
- Vorskla (L)
- Oril (L)
- Samara (L)
- Konka (Kherson Oblast)
- Konka (Zaporizhzhia Oblast)
- Bilozerka (L)
- Bazavluk (R)
- Inhulets (R)

Many small direct tributaries also exist, such as, in the Kyiv area, the Syrets (right bank) in the north of the city, the historically significant Lybid (right bank) passing west of the centre, and the Borshahivka (right bank) to the south. The water resources of the Dnieper basin compose around 80% of the total for all Ukraine.

=== Rapids ===
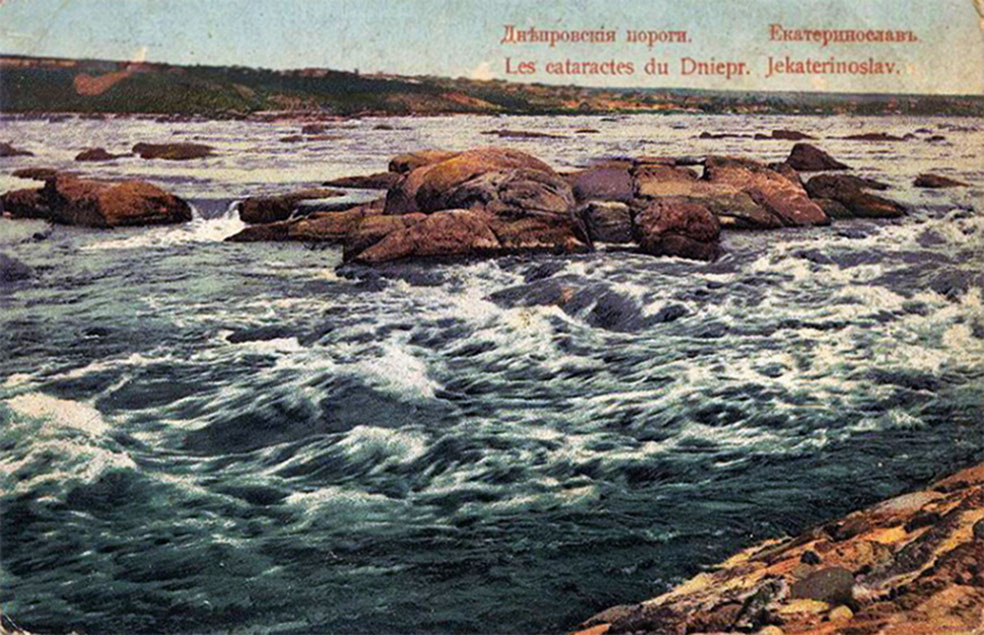
Rapids at Dnieper in 1915

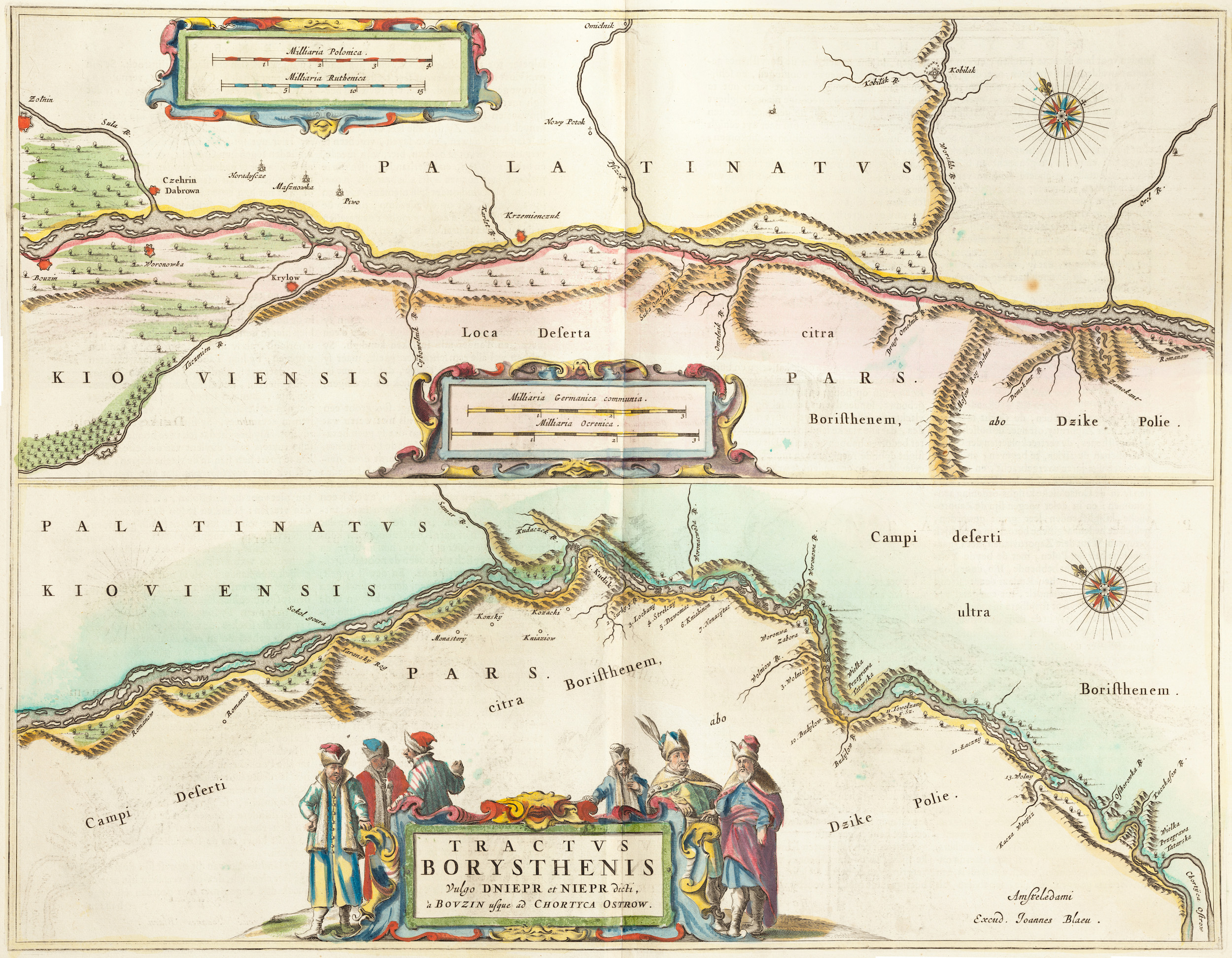
Tractus Borysthenis or Dnieper (from Bovzin city to Chortyca island) in 1662

The Dnieper Rapids were part of the trade route from the Varangians to the Greeks, first mentioned in the Kyiv Chronicle. The route was probably established in the late 8th and early 9th centuries and gained importance from the 10th until the early part of the 11th century. On the Dnieper the Varangians had to portage their ships round seven rapids, where they had to be on guard for Pecheneg nomads.

Along this middle flow of the Dnieper, there were 9 major rapids (although some sources cite a smaller number), obstructing almost the whole width of the river, about 30 to 40 smaller rapids, obstructing only part of the river, and about 60 islands and islets.

After the Dnieper hydroelectric station was built in 1932, they were inundated by Dnieper Reservoir.

=== Canals ===
There are a number of canals connected to the Dnieper:

- The Dnipro – Donbas Canal;
- The Dnipro – Kryvyi Rih Canal;
- The Kakhovka Irrigation System (including Kakhovka Canal, SE Kherson Oblast);
- The Krasnoznamianka Irrigation System (SW Kherson Oblast);
- The North Crimean Canal—will largely solve the water problem of the peninsula, especially in the arid northern and eastern Crimea;
- The Inhulets Irrigation System.

=== Fauna ===
The river is part of the quagga mussel's native range. The mussel has been accidentally introduced around the world, where it has become an invasive species.

=== Delta ===
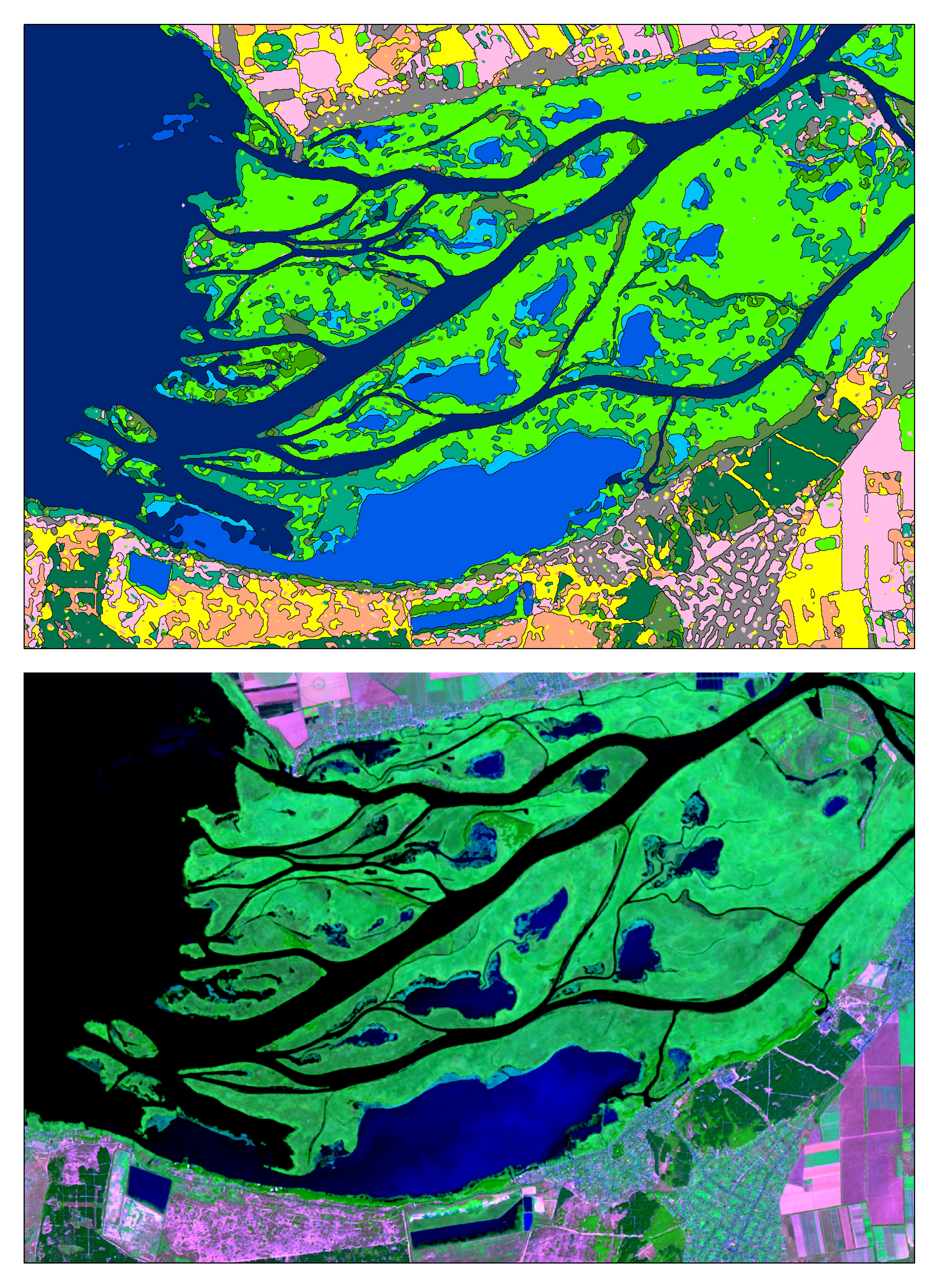
Thematic map (upper) and false-colour IR from satellite images of the Dnieper delta, captured 8 August 2015

The city of Kherson lies on the northern bank, upstream of the Dnieper delta, before the Dnieper meets the Southern Bug river in the Dnieper–Bug estuary.

== Ecology ==
Nowadays the Dnieper River suffers from anthropogenic influence resulting in numerous emissions of pollutants. The Dnieper is close to the Prydniprovsky Chemical Plant radioactive dumps (near Kamianske) and susceptible to leakage of its radioactive waste. The river is also close to the Chernobyl Nuclear Power Station (Chernobyl Exclusion Zone) which is located next to the mouth of the Pripyat River.

== Navigation ==
Almost 2,000 km (1,200 mi) of the river is navigable (to the city of Dorogobuzh). 90% of river transport in Ukraine occurs on the Dnieper, however, its overall contribution to total transport is less than 0.5%. Its reservoirs have large ship locks, allowing vessels of up to 270 by 18 metres (886 ft × 59 ft) access as far as the port of Kyiv, and thus are an important transportation corridor. The river is used by passenger vessels as well. Inland cruises on the rivers Danube and Dnieper have had a growing market in recent decades.

Upstream from Kyiv, the Dnieper receives the water of the Pripyat River. This navigable river connects to the Dnieper-Bug canal, the link with the Bug River. Historically, a connection with the Western European waterways was possible, but a weir without any ship lock near the town of Brest, Belarus, has interrupted this international waterway. Poor political relations between Western Europe and Belarus mean there is little likelihood of reopening this waterway in the near future. River navigation is interrupted each year by freezing and severe winter storms.

== Reservoirs and hydroelectric power ==
Dams and hydroelectric stations in the Dniepr. (Ukraine)

From the mouth of the Pripyat to the Kakhovka Hydroelectric Station, there are six sets of dams and hydroelectric stations, which produce 10% of Ukraine's electricity. The Kakhovka dam was destroyed on 6 June 2023 during the Russian invasion of Ukraine, with the subsequent drying up of the Kakhovka Reservoir revealing the original course of the river in the area and disconnecting four canal networks known as the Great Meadow.

The first constructed was the Dnieper Hydroelectric Station (or DniproHES) near Zaporizhzhia, built between 1927 and 1932 with an output of 558 MW. It was destroyed during World War II, but was rebuilt from 1944–1950 with an output of 750 MW, supplying 3.5 billion kWh of electricity annually.

Location	Dam	Reservoir area	Hydroelectric station	Date of construction
Kyiv	Kyiv Reservoir	922 km^{2} or 356 mi^{2}	Kyiv Hydroelectric Station	1960–1964
Kaniv	Kaniv Reservoir	675 km^{2} or 261 mi^{2}	Kaniv Hydroelectric Station	1963–1975
Kremenchuk	Kremenchuk Reservoir	2,250 km^{2} or 870 mi^{2}	Kremenchuk Hydroelectric Station	1954–1960
Kamianske	Kamianske Reservoir	567 km^{2} or 219 mi^{2}	Middle Dnieper Hydroelectric Power Plant	1956–1964
Zaporizhzhia	Dnieper Reservoir	420 km^{2} or 160 mi^{2}	Dnieper Hydroelectric Station	1927–1932; 1944–1950
Kakhovka	Kakhovka Reservoir	2,155 km^{2} or 832 mi^{2}	Kakhovka Hydroelectric Station†	1950–1956

== Regions and cities ==
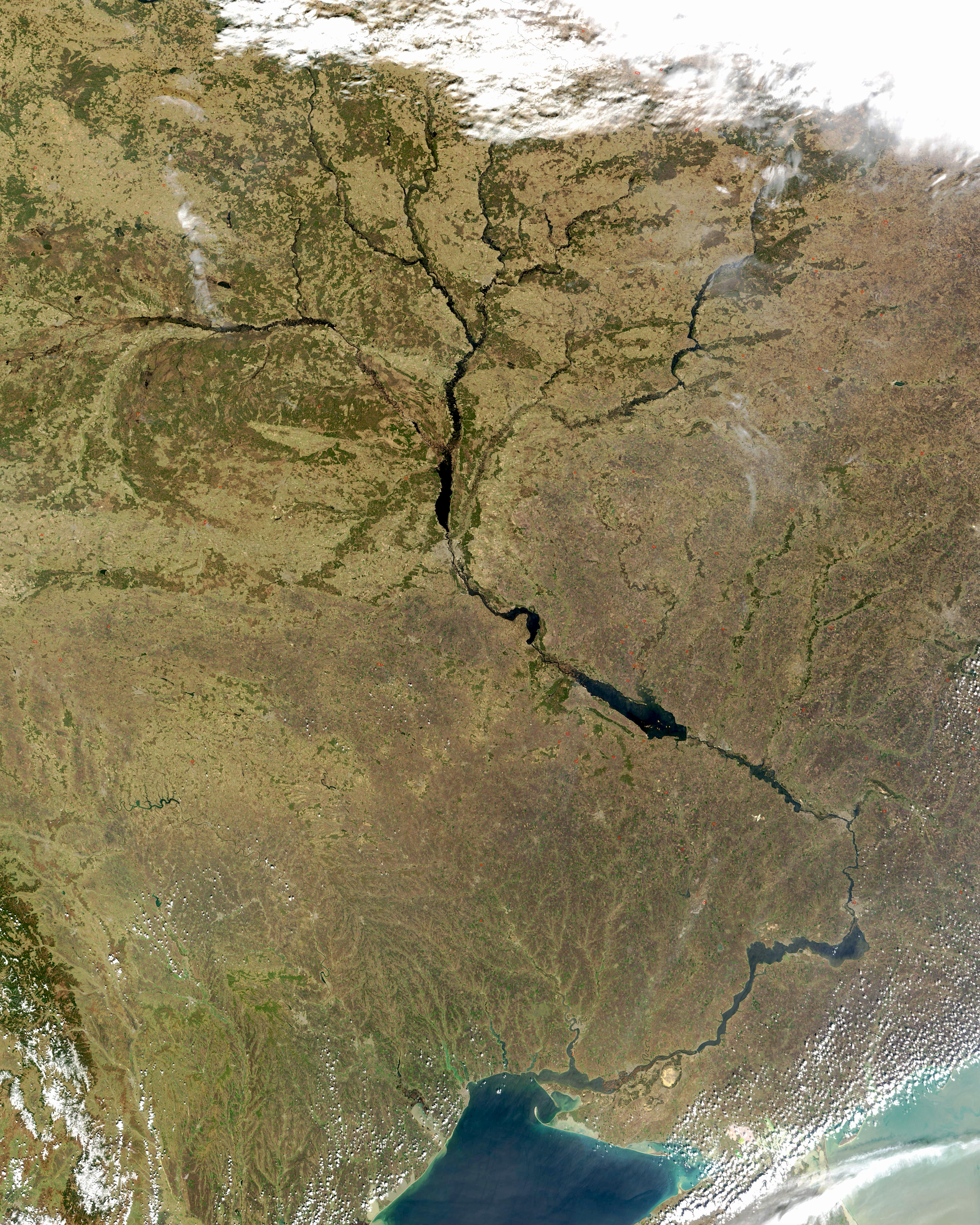
Satellite image of the Dnieper and its tributaries

=== Regions ===
- Smolensk Oblast, Russia
- Vitebsk Region, Belarus
- Mogilev Region, Belarus
- Gomel Region, Belarus
- Chernihiv Oblast, Ukraine
- Kyiv Oblast, Ukraine
- Cherkasy Oblast, Ukraine
- Kirovohrad Oblast, Ukraine
- Poltava Oblast, Ukraine
- Dnipropetrovsk Oblast, Ukraine
- Zaporizhzhia Oblast, Ukraine
- Kherson Oblast, Ukraine

The Dnieper River in different regions

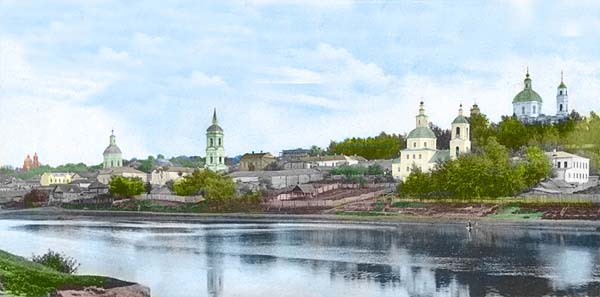
The Dnieper River in Dorogobuzh, Russian Empire, before 1917

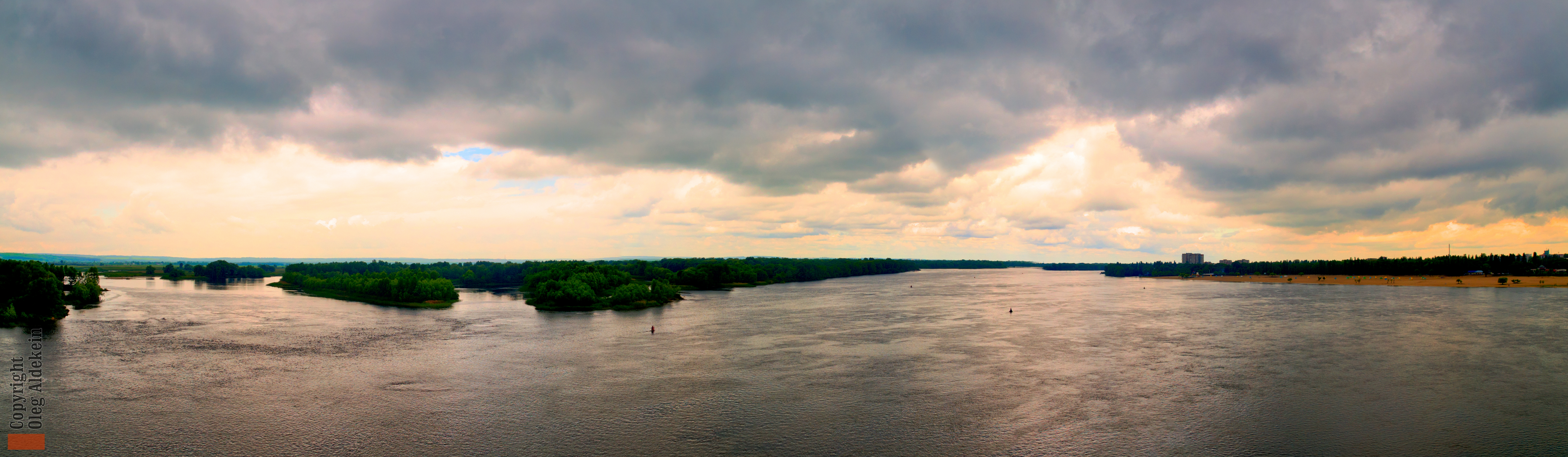
The Dnieper River in Kremenchuk, Ukraine

The Dnieper river in Ukraine from a helicopter, 2004

=== Cities ===
Major cities, over 100,000 in population, are in bold script. Cities and towns located on the Dnieper are listed in order from the river's source (in Russia) to its mouth (in Ukraine):

- Dorogobuzh, Russia
- **Smolensk**, Russia
- **Orsha**, Belarus
- Shklow, Belarus
- **Mogilev**, Belarus
- Bykhaw, Belarus
- Rahachow, Belarus
- Zhlobin, Belarus
- Rechytsa, Belarus
- Vyshhorod, Ukraine
- **Kyiv**, Ukraine
- Ukrainka, Ukraine
- Pereiaslav, Ukraine
- Kaniv, Ukraine
- **Cherkasy**, Ukraine
- Svitlovodsk, Ukraine
- **Kremenchuk**, Ukraine
- Horishni Plavni, Ukraine
- **Kamianske**, Ukraine
- **Dnipro**, Ukraine
- **Zaporizhzhia**, Ukraine
- Marhanets, Ukraine
- **Nikopol**, Ukraine
- Enerhodar, Ukraine
- Kamianka-Dniprovska, Ukraine
- Kakhovka, Ukraine
- Nova Kakhovka, Ukraine
- **Kherson**, Ukraine

Arheimar, a capital of the Goths, was located on the Dnieper, according to the Hervarar saga.

== In the arts ==
=== Literature ===
The River Dnieper has been a subject of chapter X of a story by Nikolai Gogol A Terrible Vengeance (1831, published in 1832 as a part of the Evenings on a Farm Near Dikanka short stories collection). It is considered as a classical example of the description of nature in Russian literature. The river was also described in the works of Taras Shevchenko.

In the adventure novel The Long Ships (also translated Red Orm), set during the Viking Age, a Scanian chieftain travels to the Dnieper Rapids to retrieve a treasure hidden there by his brother, encountering many difficulties. The novel was very popular in Sweden and is one of few to depict a Viking voyage to eastern Europe.

=== Films ===
The River Dnieper makes an appearance in the 1964 Hungarian drama film The Sons of the Stone-Hearted Man (based on the novel of the same name by Mór Jókai), where it appears when two characters are leaving Saint Petersburg but get attacked by wolves.

In 1983, the concert program "Song of the Dnieper" from the "Victory Salute" series was released, dedicated to the 40th anniversary of the liberation of the city of Kiev from the German fascist invaders. The program includes songs by Soviet composers, Ukrainian folk songs, and dances performed by the Song and Dance Ensemble of the Kiev Military District led by A. Pustovalov, P. Virsky Ukrainian National Folk Dance Ensemble, Kyiv Bandurist Capella, the Military Band of the Headquarters of the Kiev Military District led by A. Kuzmenko, singers Anatoliy Mokrenko, Lyudmila Zykina, Anatoliy Solovianenko, Dmytro Hnatyuk, Mykola Hnatyuk. Filming on the battlefield, streets and squares of Kiev. Scriptwriter – Victor Meerovsky. Directed by Victor Cherkasov. Operator – Alexander Platonov.

The 2018 film Volcano was filmed at the river in Beryslav, Kherson Oblast.

=== Music ===
In 1941, the Soviet composer Mark Fradkin wrote "Song of the Dnieper" to the words of Yevgeniy Dolmatovsky.

=== Visual arts ===
The Dnieper has been a subject for many artists over the centuries.

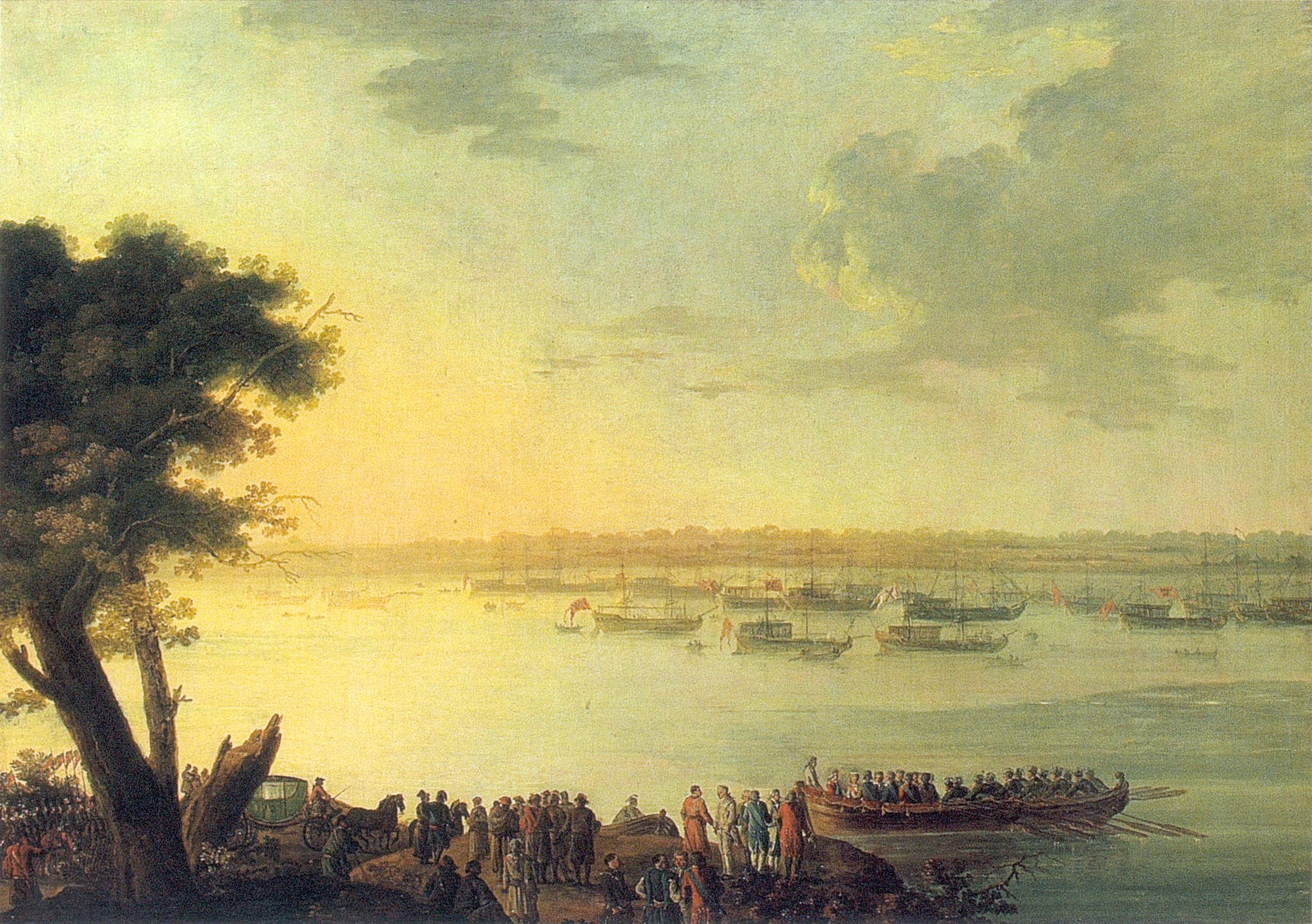
Jan Bogumi Plersz, Catherine II Leaving Kaniów in 1787 (c. 1787), Borys Voznytsky Lviv National Art Gallery

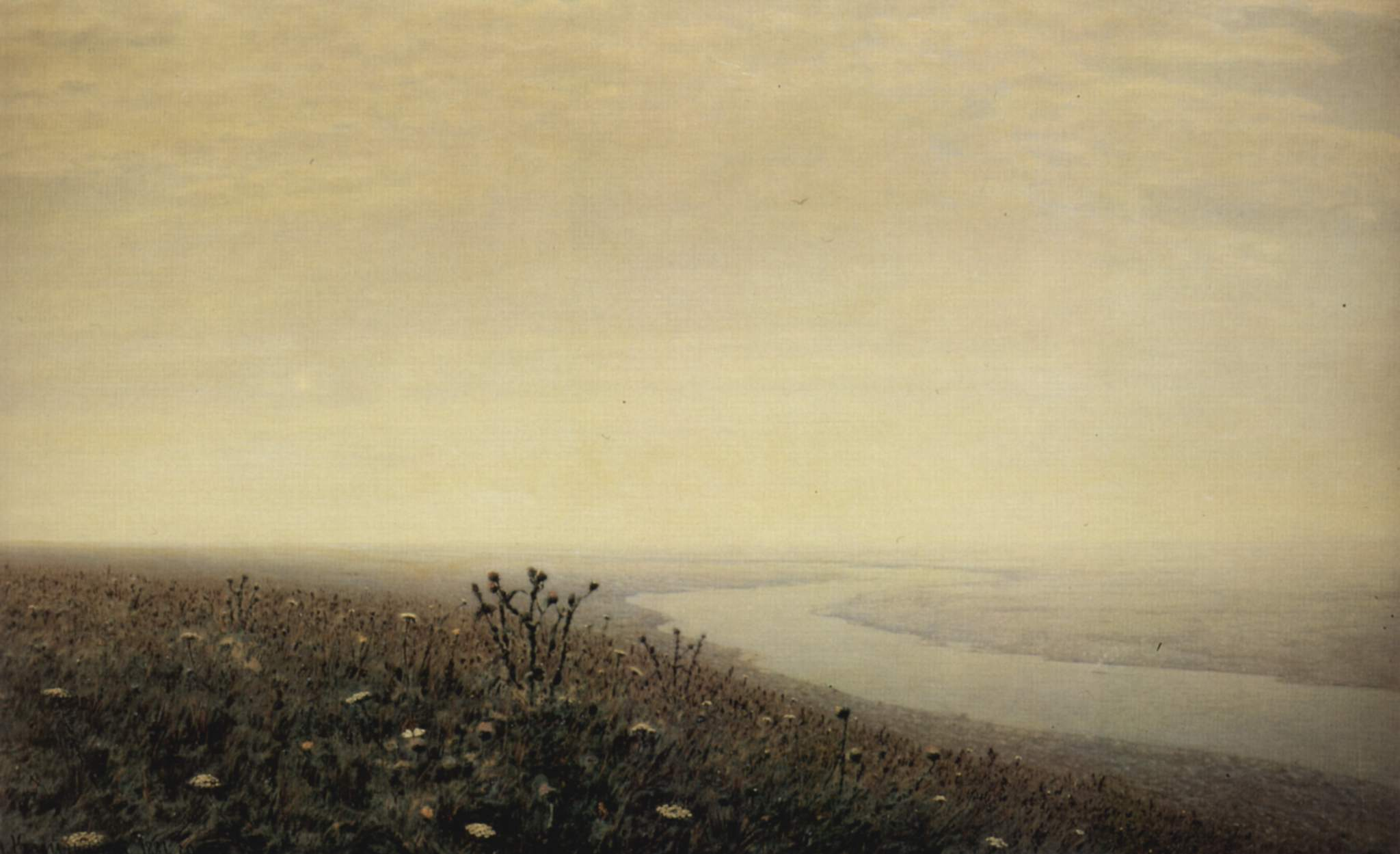
Arkhip Kuindzhi, Dnieper (1881), Tretyakov Gallery (Moscow)

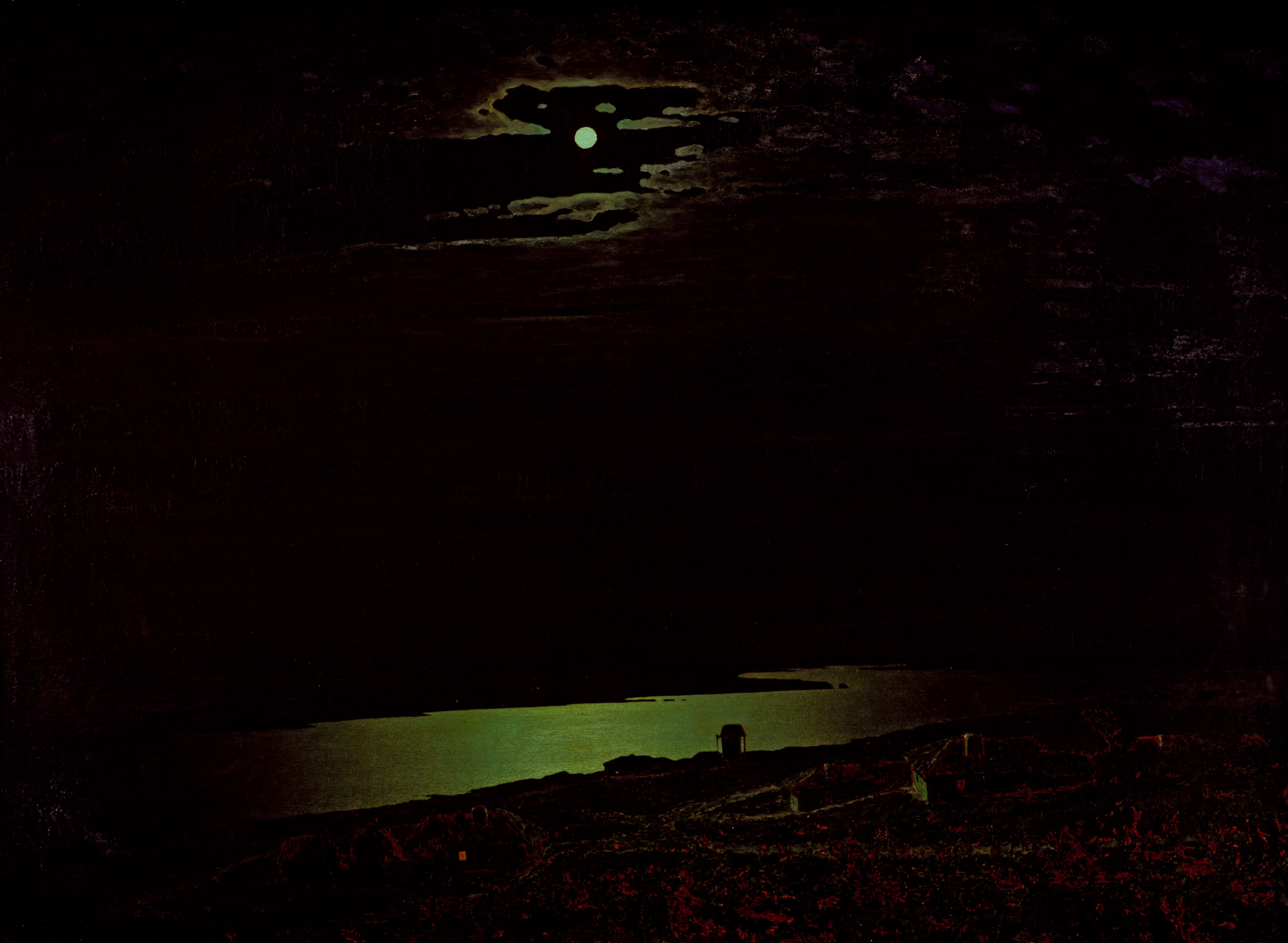
Arkhip Kuindzhi, Moonlit Night on the Dnieper (1882), Tretyakov Gallery

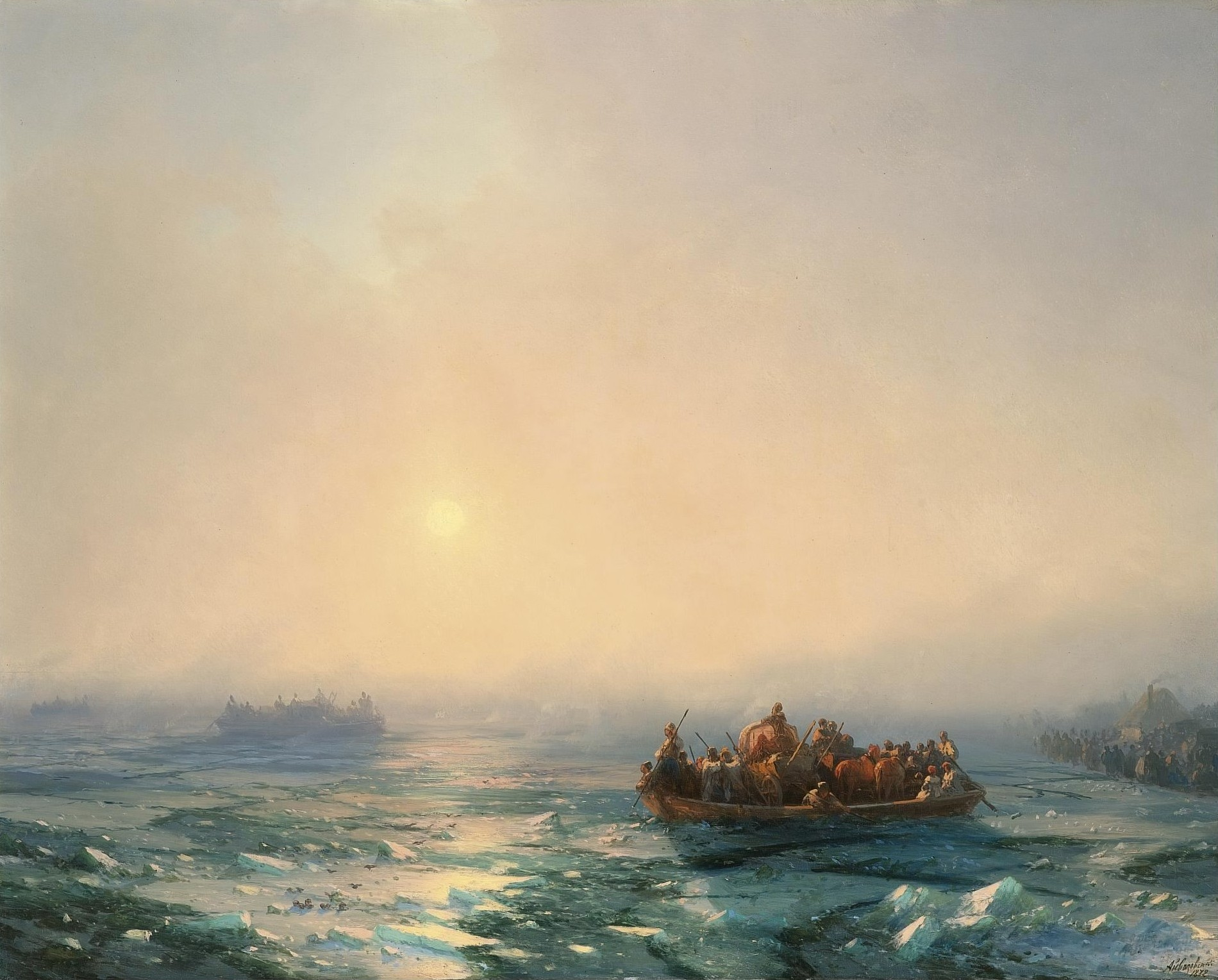
Ivan Aivazovsky, Ice in the Dnieper (1872), private collection

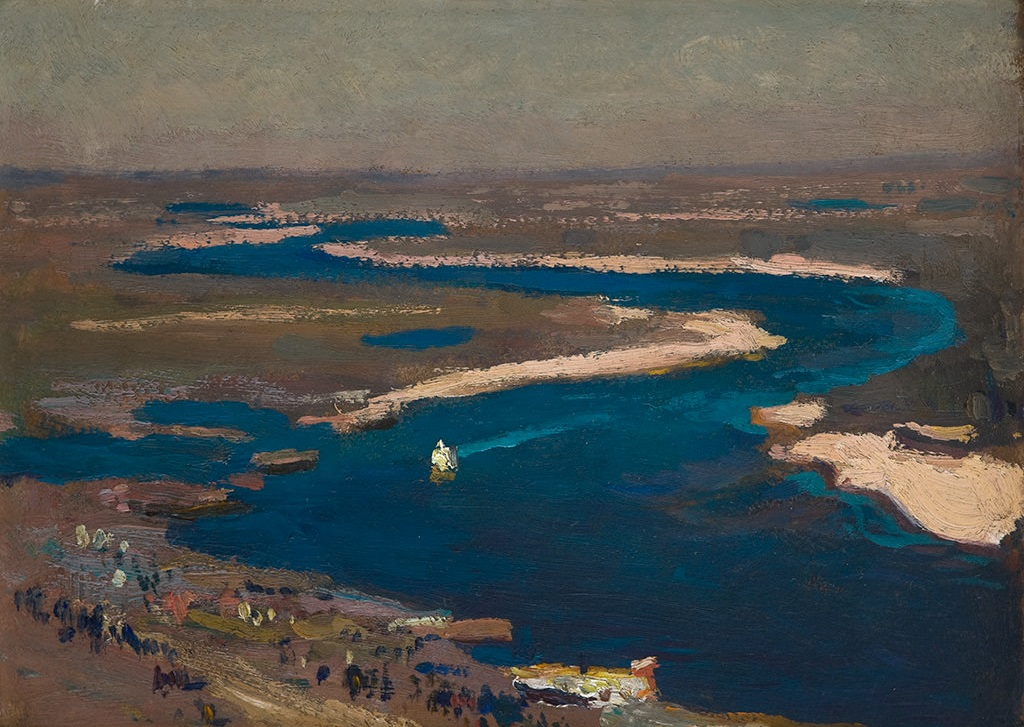
Jan Stanisławski, Sapphire Dnieper' (1904), National Museum in Kraków

=== Popular culture ===
The Dnieper is one of the national symbols of Ukraine. It is mentioned in the country's national anthem. Several historical geographical names relating to Ukraine include the name of the river, such as Dnieper Ukraine (Naddniprianshchyna), Right-bank Ukraine, and Left-bank Ukraine. The Ukrainian cities of Dnipro, Dniprorudne, Kamianka-Dniprovska are named after the river.

The Zaporozhian Cossacks lived on the lower Dnieper and their name refers to their location, "beyond the rapids".

The folk metal band Turisas have a song called "The Dnieper Rapids" on their 2007 album The Varangian Way.

== See also ==
- 2022–23 Dnipro River skirmishes
- List of crossings of the Dnieper
- Middle Dnieper culture
- Trade route from the Varangians to the Greeks

== Sources ==
- Bukharin, Mikhail Dmitrievich [in Russian] (2013). "Колаксай и его братья (античная традиция о происхождении царской власти у скифов" [Kolaxais and his Brothers (Classical Tradition on the Origin of the Royal Power of the Scythians)]. Аристей: вестник классической филологии и античной истории (in Russian). 8: 20–80.
- Felecan, Oliviu; Bughesiu, Alina (2021). Names and Naming: Multicultural Aspects. Springer Nature. ISBN 9783030731861.
- Kullanda, S. V. [in Russian] (2013). "Скифские этимологии" [Scythian Etymologies]. In Kolganova, G. Y.; Kullanda, S. V. [in Russian]; Nemirovsky, A. A. [in Russian]; Petrova, A. A.; Safronov, A. V. (eds.). Иранский Мир II – I тыс. до н.э. Материалы международной научной конференции, посвященной памяти Эдвина Арвидовича Грантовского и Дмитрия Сергеевича Раевского. Выпуск VI [Iranian World 2nd – 1st millennium BC. Proceedings of the International Scientific conference Dedicated to the Memory of Edwin Arvidovich Grantovsky and Dmitry Sergeevich Raevsky. Issue VI]. Moscow, Russia: Institute of Oriental Studies of the Russian Academy of Sciences. pp. 38–48. ISBN 978-5-892-82576-4.
- Harmatta, János (1999). "Herodotus, Historian of the Cimmerians and the Scythians". In Reverdin, Olivier [in French]; Nenci, Giuseppe [in Italian] (eds.). Hérodote et les Peuples Non Grecs [Herodotus and the Non-Greek Peoples] (in French). Vandœuvres, Switzerland: Fondation Hardt pour l'étude de l'Antiquité classique. pp. 115–130. ISBN 978-3-774-92415-4.
