= Stuhna =

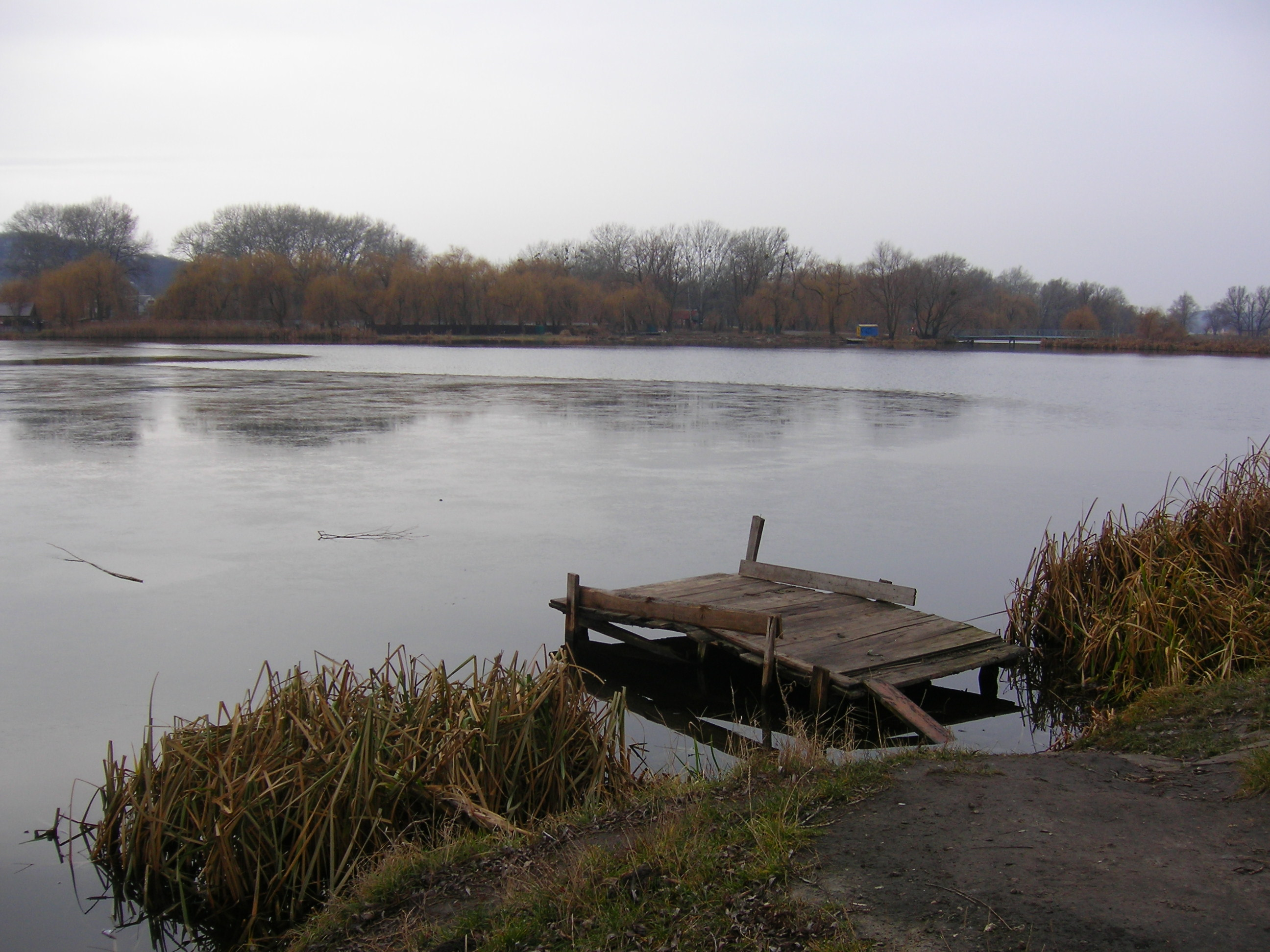
- Stuhna River in Vasylkiv

- Location in Ukraine
- Native name: Стугна (Ukrainian)

Location
- Country: Ukraine
- Oblast: Kyiv Oblast
- Raion: Fastiv, Obukhiv
- Cities: Vasylkiv, Obukhiv

Physical characteristics
- Source
  - location: Near the northern outskirts of the village Velyka Snitynka, Fastiv Raion
  - coordinates: 50°06′01″N 30°01′04″E
  - elevation: 204 m (669 ft)
- Mouth: Dnieper
  - location: Ukrainka, Obukhiv Raion
  - coordinates: 50°09′30″N 30°44′25″E
  - elevation: 90 m (300 ft)
- Length: 69.5 km (43.2 mi)
- Basin size: 787 km^{2} (304 sq mi)

Basin features
- Progression: Dnieper→ Dnieper–Bug estuary→ Black Sea
- Tributaries
  - left: Zdorivka, Ocheretyanka, Buhayivka, Tykhan
  - right: Khorvatka, Chortykha, Barakhtyanka, Rakivka, Kobrynka

The Stuhna (Ukrainian: Стугна), or Stugna (Russian: Стугна), is a minor river in Ukraine, a right tributary of Dnieper River. Its length is 68 km.

The river was mentioned in the Tale of Igor's Campaign and was a place of the Battle of the Stuhna River.

Cities located on the river: Vasylkiv, Obukhiv and Ukrainka. Additionally, Stuhna passes through the settlements of Velyka Snitynka, Motovylivska Slobidka, Velyka Motovylivka, Mala Soltanivka, Borova, Skrypky, Khlepcha, Velyka Soltanivka, Zdorivka, Zastuhna, Zarichchia, Kopachiv, Pohreby, Berezove, Tarasivka, Novi Bezradychi, and Tatsenky.
