= Supii =

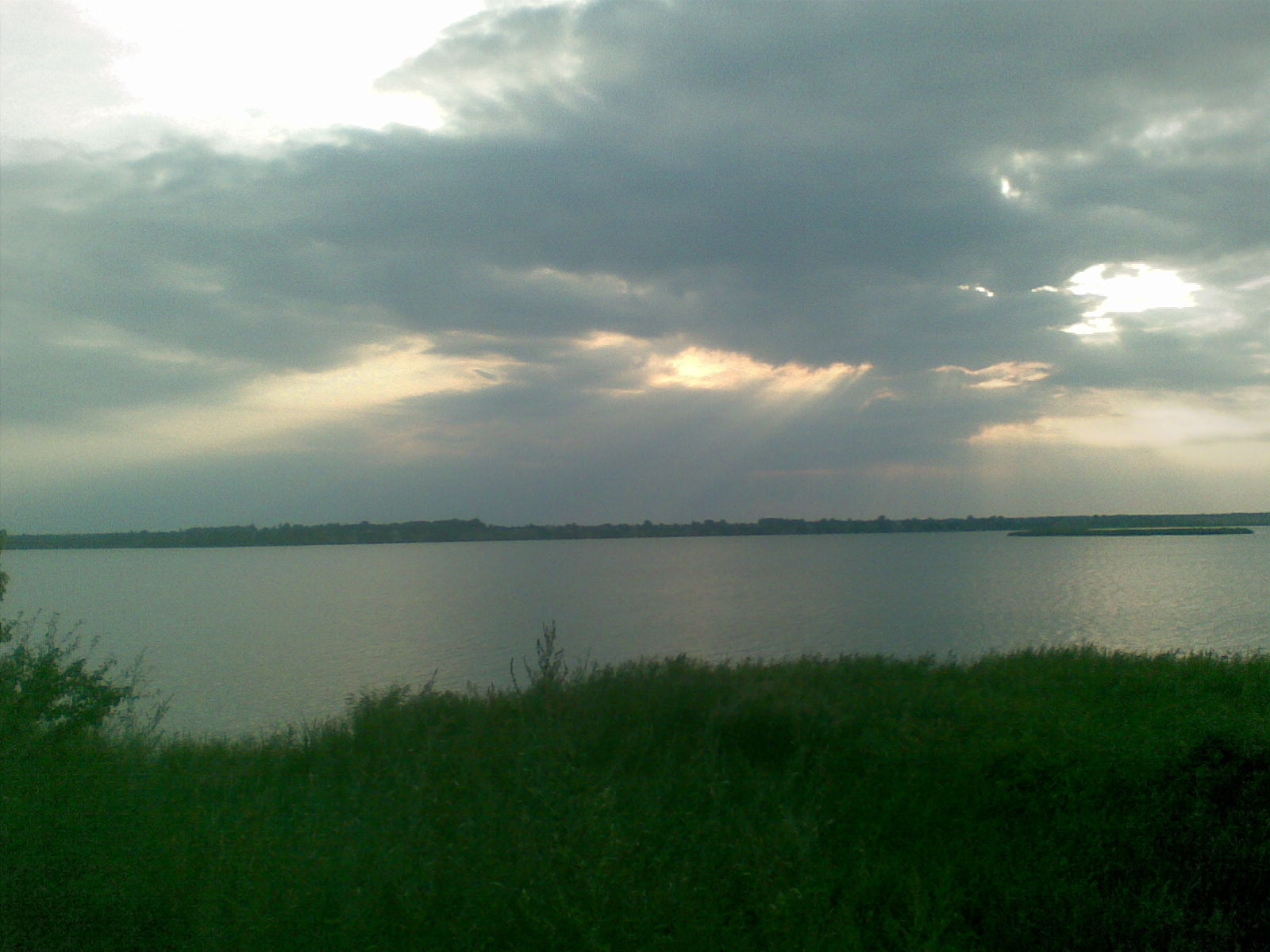
- The Supii near Yahotyn

Location
- Country: Ukraine

Physical characteristics
- Source
  - location: Chernihiv Oblast, Ukraine
- Mouth: Dnieper
  - coordinates: 49.6238°N 31.8003°E
- Length: 130 km (81 mi)
- Basin size: 2,000 km^{2} (770 sq mi)

Basin features
- Progression: Dnieper→ Dnieper–Bug estuary→ Black Sea

The Supii (Ukrainian: Супій) is a river in Ukraine, 130 km in length, a left tributary of the Dnieper. The Supii finds its source in Nizhyn Raion, Chernihiv Oblast.

== Cities and towns on the Supii ==
- Zghurivka
- Yahotyn
