= Vyazma (river) =

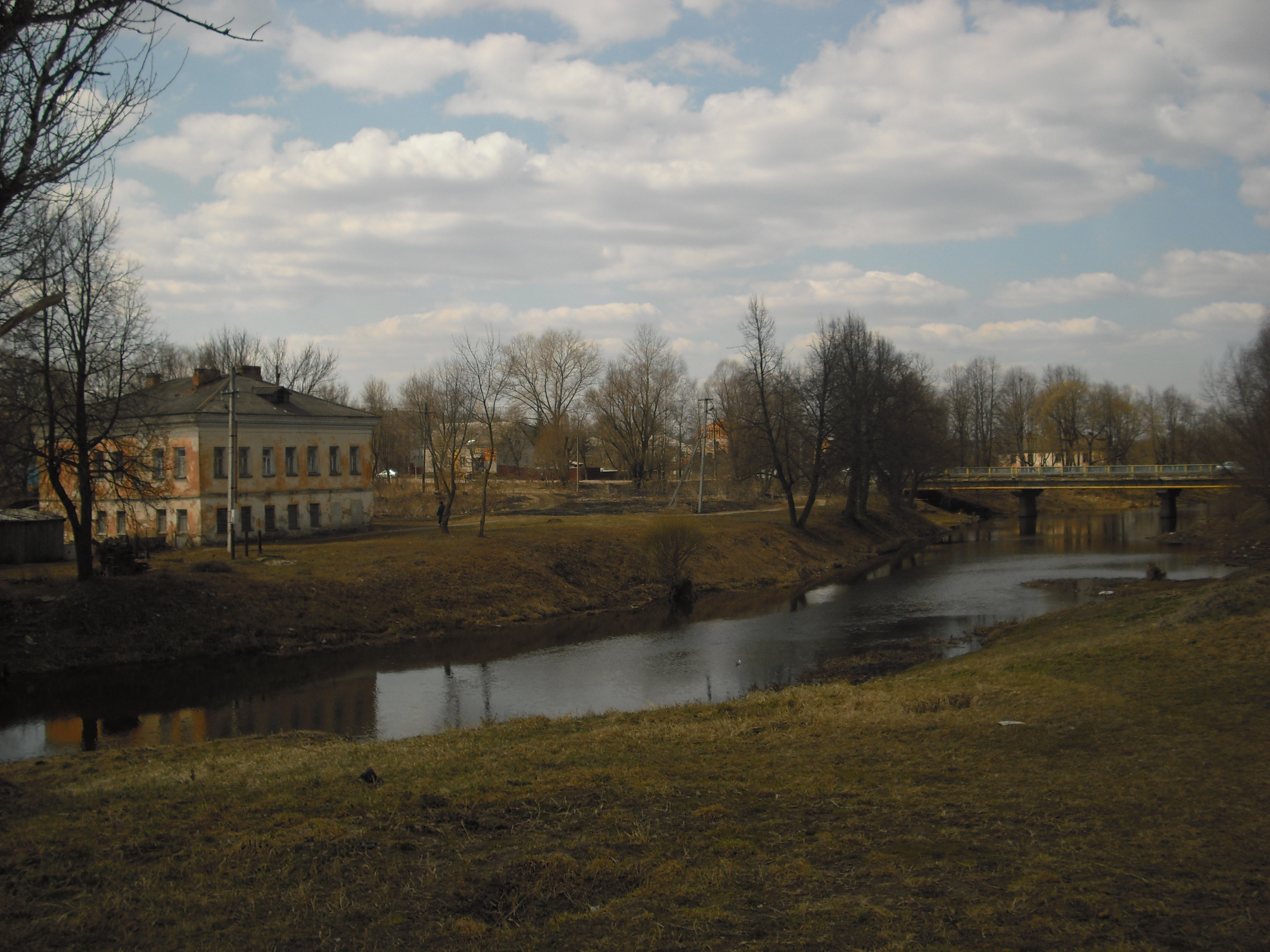

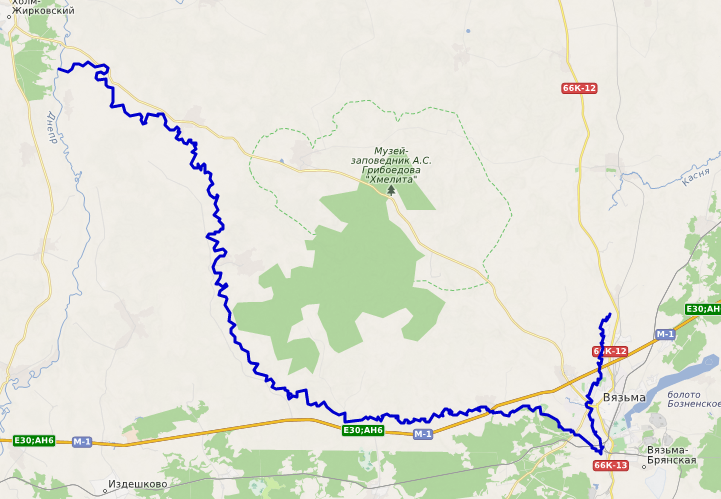
- Native name: Вязьма (Russian)

Location
- Country: Russia

Physical characteristics
- Mouth: Dnieper
  - coordinates: 55°28′24″N 33°33′31″E
- Length: 147 km (91 mi)
- Basin size: 1,350 km^{2} (520 sq mi)

Basin features
- Progression: Dnieper→ Dnieper–Bug estuary→ Black Sea

The Vyazma (Russian: Вязьма) is a river in Smolensk Oblast, Russia. It is a left tributary of the Dnieper. The length of the river is 147 kilometres (91 mi). The area of its basin is 1,350 square kilometres (520 sq mi). In ancient times, the Vyazma River was a part of a route that connected the upper basins of the Volga, Oka, and Dnieper with the help of portages. The city of Vyazma is located on the Vyazma River.
