= Chernihiv bombing =

Chernihiv bombing may refer to:

- 3 March 2022 Chernihiv bombing
- 16 March 2022 Chernihiv breadline attack
- August 2023 Chernihiv missile strike
