= Pedestrian Bridge (Chernihiv) =

Bridge in Chernihiv, northern Ukraine

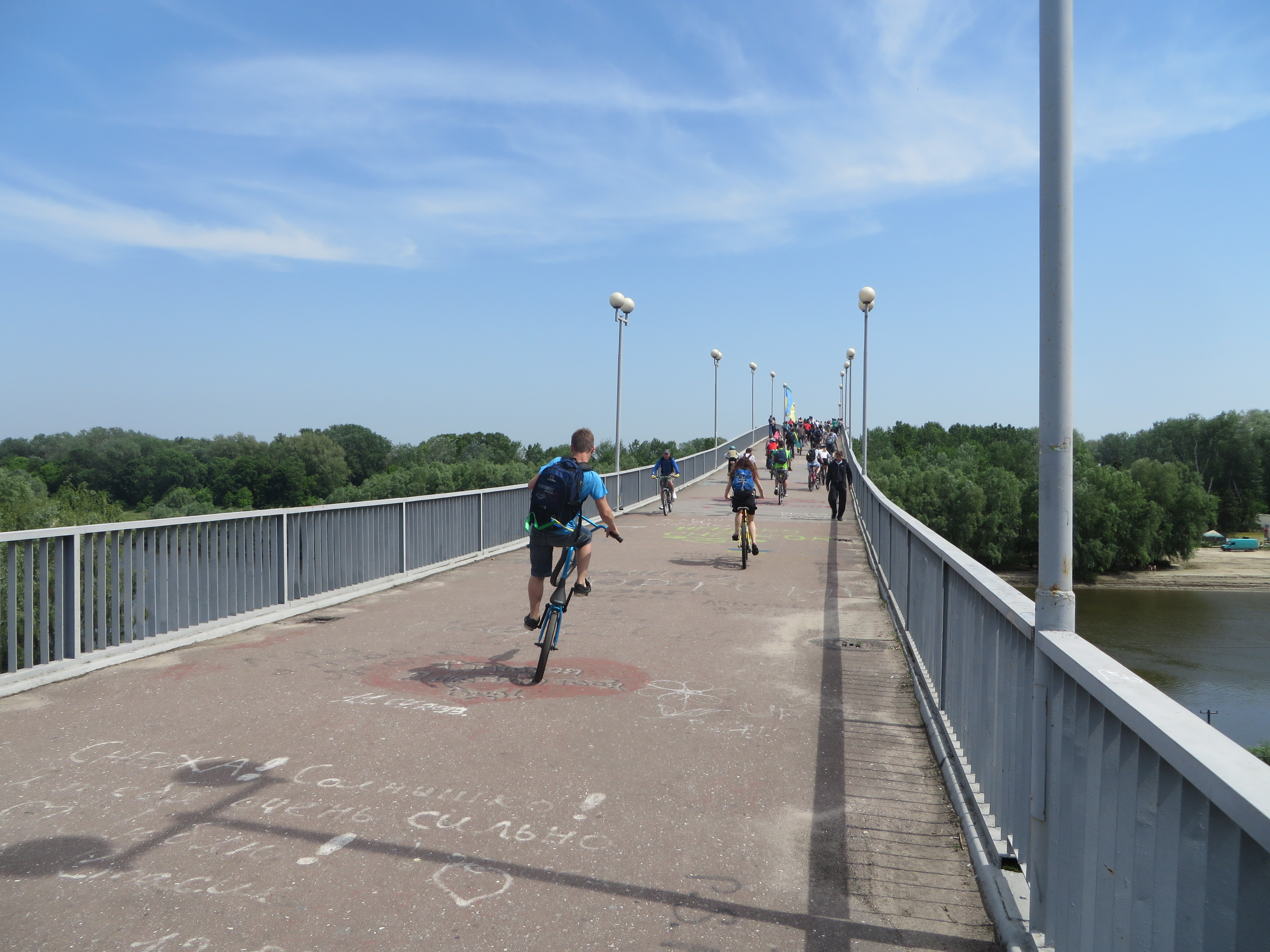
- Pedestrian Bridge, Chernihiv
- Coordinates: 51°28′55″N 31°18′37″E
- Carries: Pedestrians and (formerly) Motor vehicles
- Crosses: Desna River
- Locale: Chernihiv, Chernihiv Oblast Ukraine

Characteristics
- Total length: 95
- Width: 6 m

History
- Construction start: 1987

The Pedestrian Bridge in Chernihiv (Ukrainian: Пешеходный мост) is a footbridge over the Desna river in the city of Chernihiv, Ukraine.

== History ==
The Pedestrian Bridge is of the largest bridges in Chernihiv. It is the only pedestrian bridge across the Desna in the city of Chernihiv. It connects the left and right banks of the Desna and located next to beaches and to the Chernihiv river port. Special barriers prevent vehicles from passing through.

The bridge was built in 1987 by the NP Melnikov Central Research and Design Institute of Building Metal Structures.

In 2014, the rails were painted by activists in alternating stripes of yellow and blue. The bridge has been used as a site for bungee jumping. Some have publicly proclaimed their love there, on special, heart shaped metal structures made for the purpose.

On 23 March 2022, due to the Siege of Chernihiv by the 2022 Russian invasion of Ukraine the Kyiv Bridge for vehicle traffic was destroyed. For the subsequent for 2 weeks, the only option to leave the city across the Desna was the pedestrian bridge, so people set out on foot to get to Anisov and Kulykivka through fields. During the siege, the Pedestrian Bridge was also damaged. "In view of this, a joint decision was made with the Chernihiv Regional State Administration to limit traffic on this bridge as much as possible. Traffic is prohibited, only pedestrian crossing," operational command "North" said in a statement.(Ukrainian: З огляду на це було прийняте спільне із Чернігівською ОДА рішення максимально обмежити рух цим мостом. Транспортний рух заборонений, лише піший перехід)" As an exception, cars with the most necessary things for the defenders of Chernihiv were allowed.

== Gallery ==
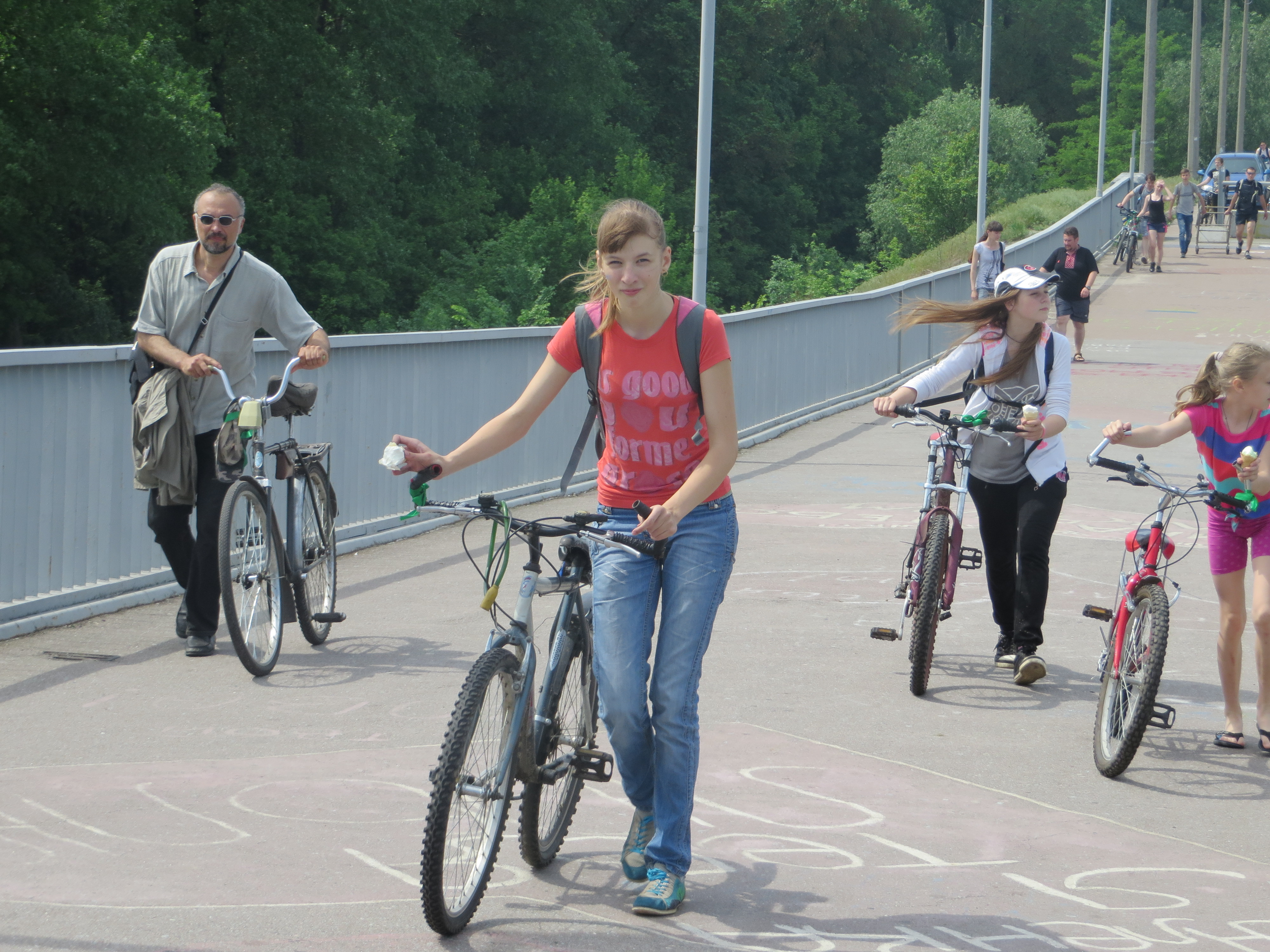
BykeDay in Chernihiv 2014

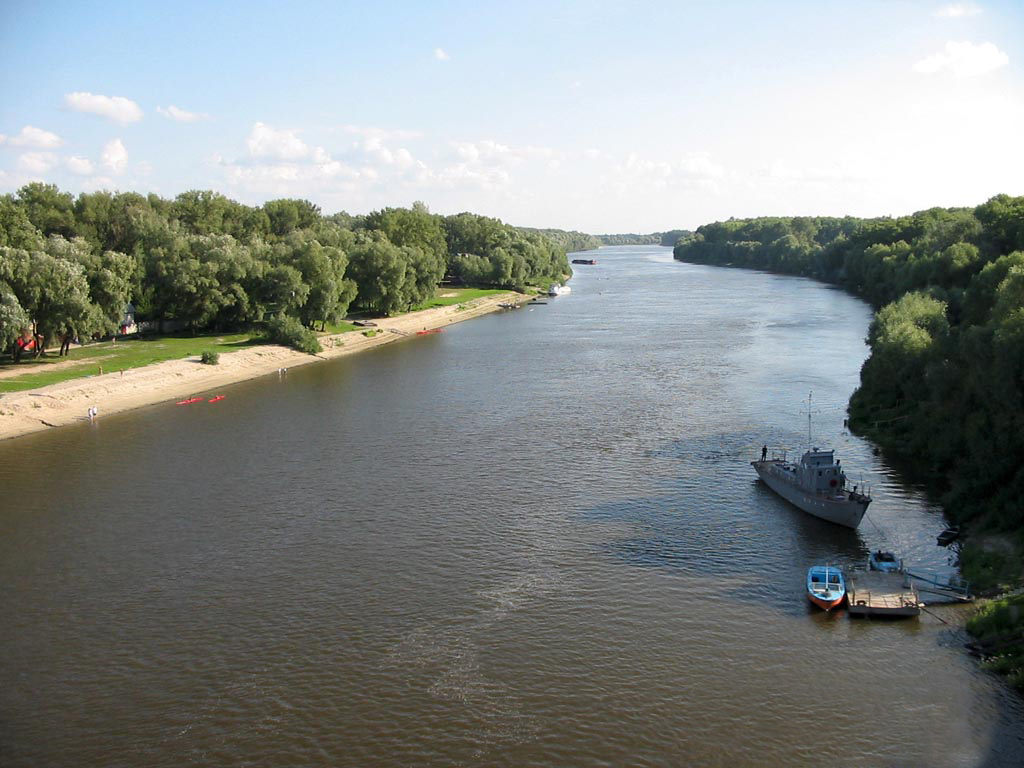
View of the Desna River

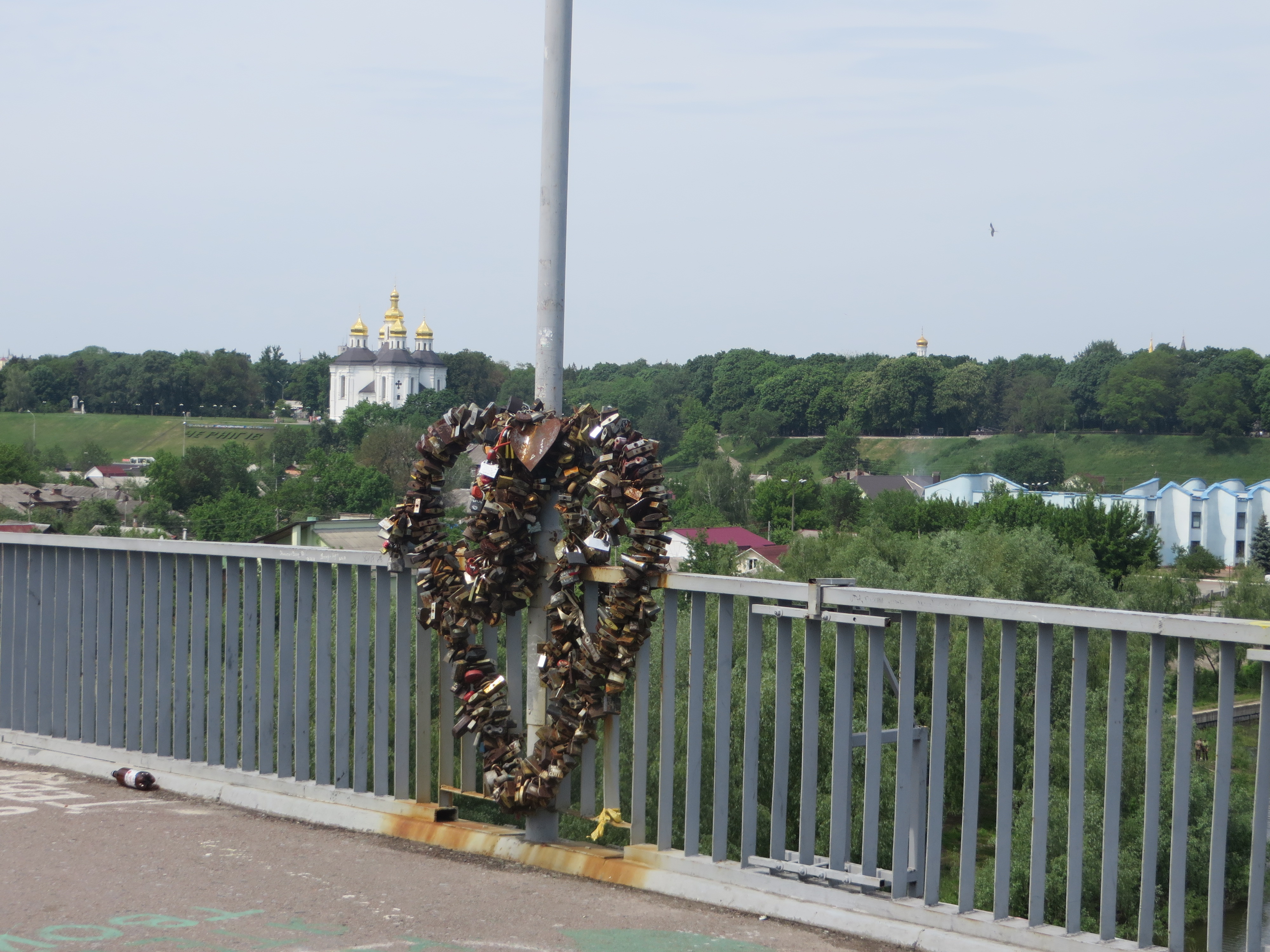

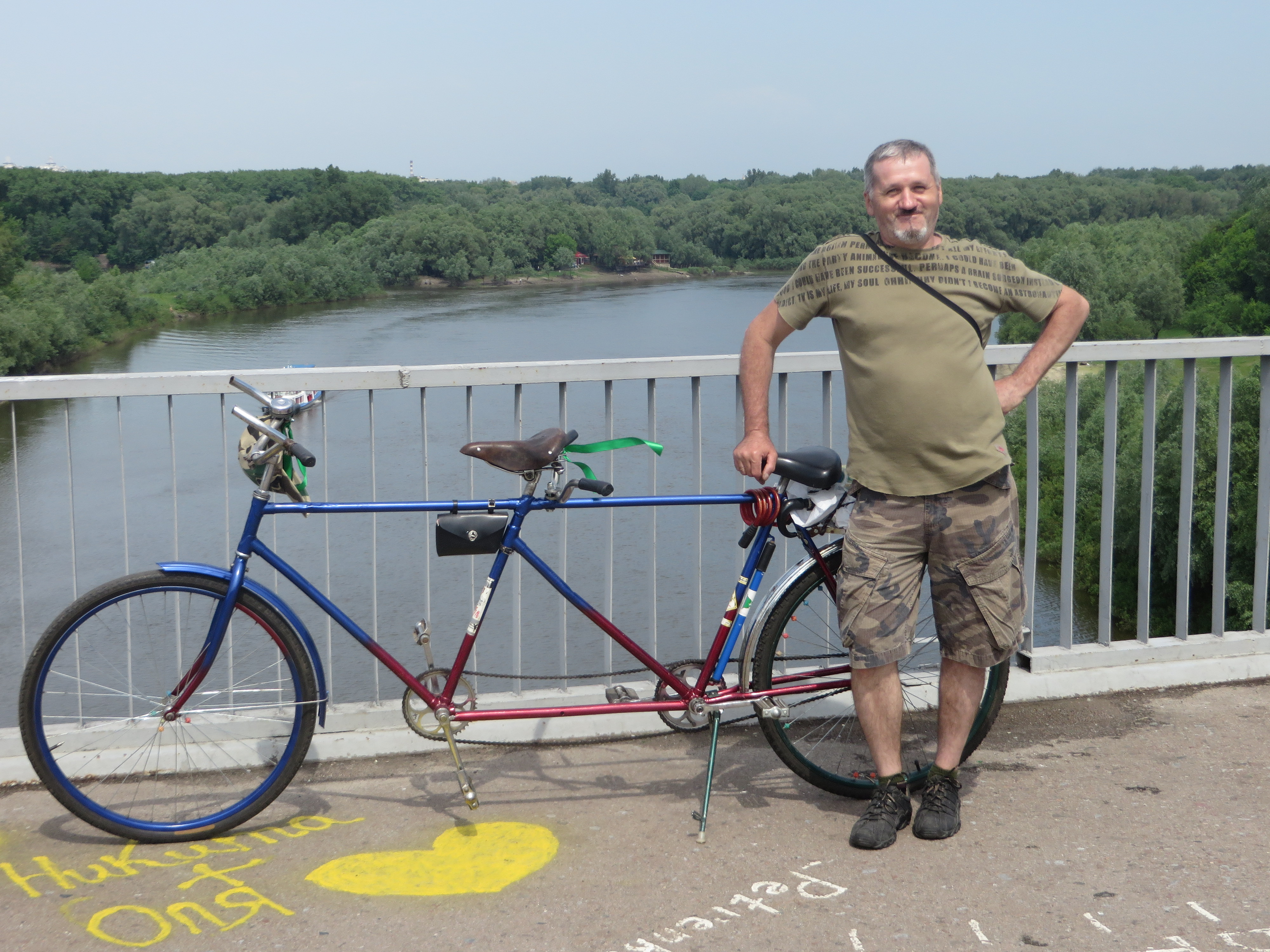

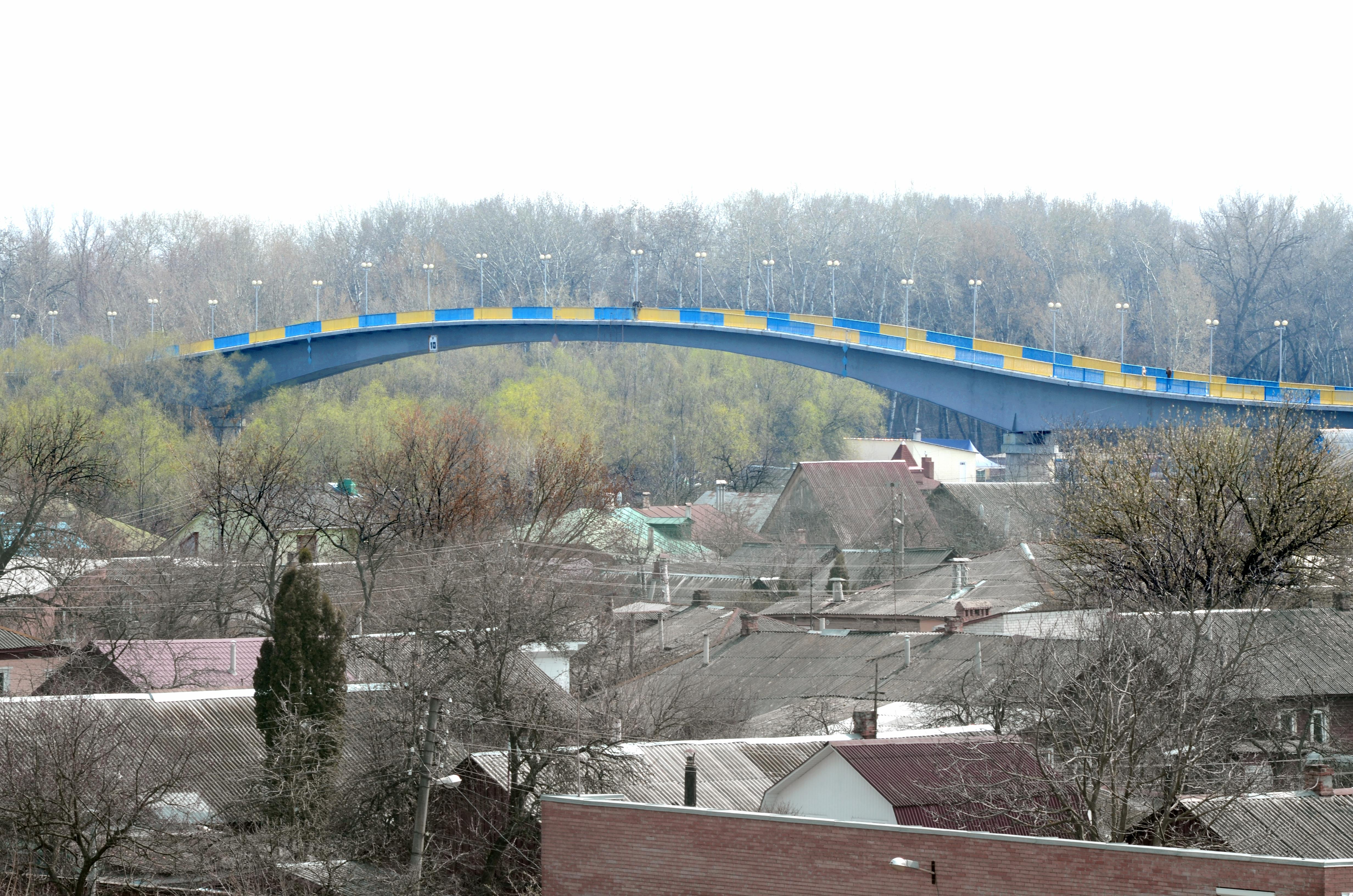

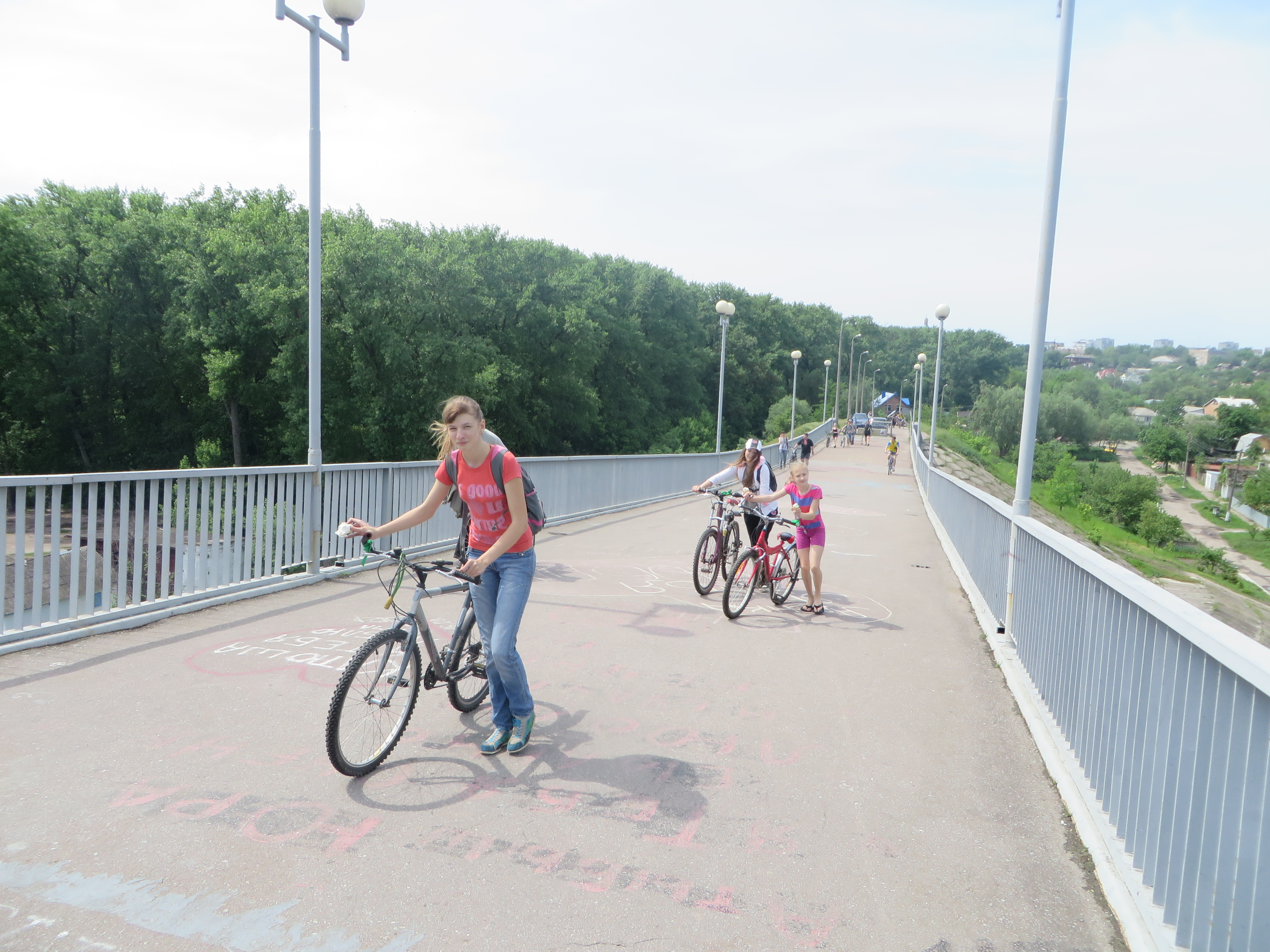
BykeDay in Chernihiv 2014

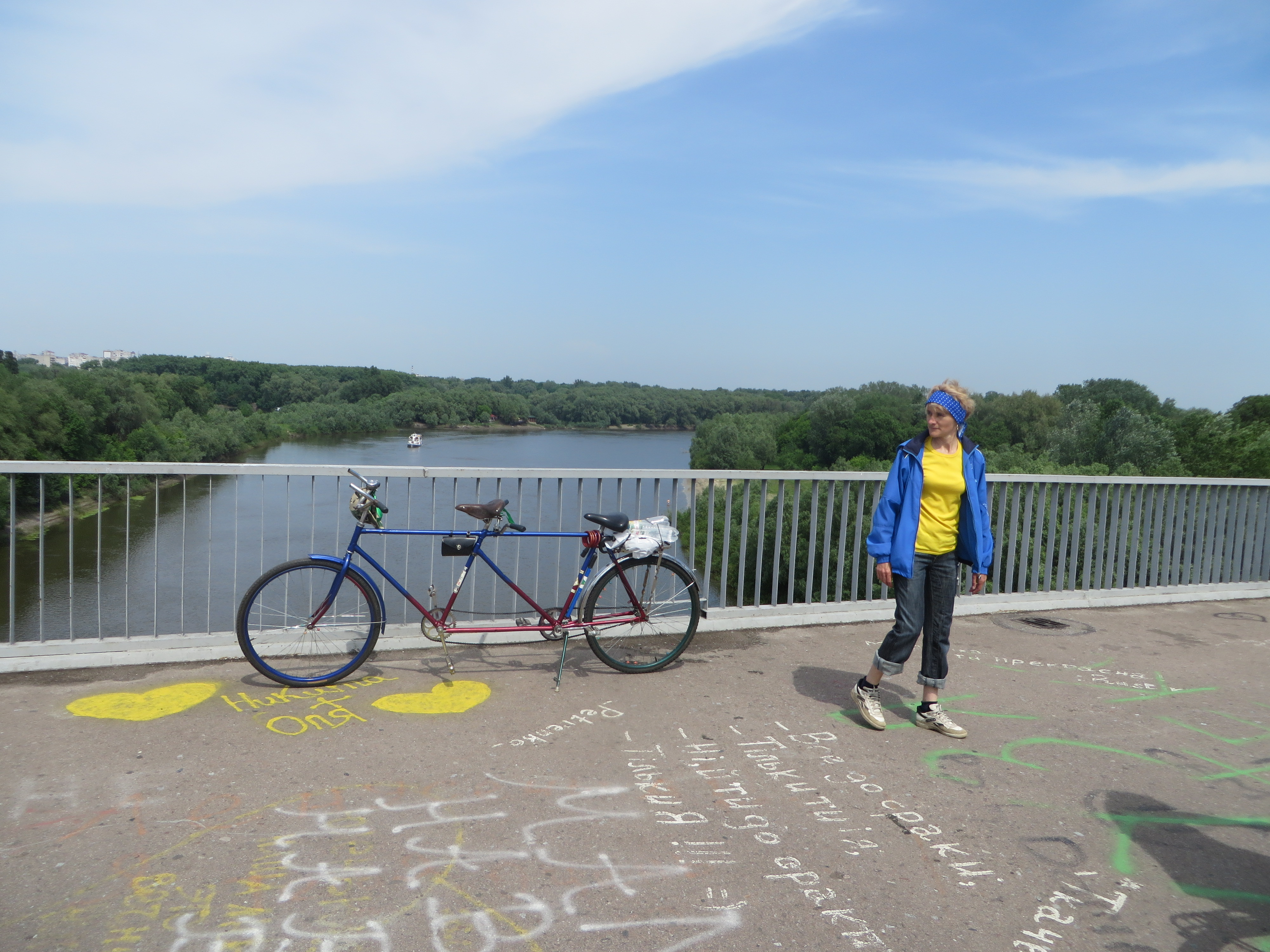
BykeDay in Chernihiv 2014
