= Siege of Chernihiv =

Battle in the Russian invasion of Ukraine

- Part of the northern front of the Russian invasion of Ukraine
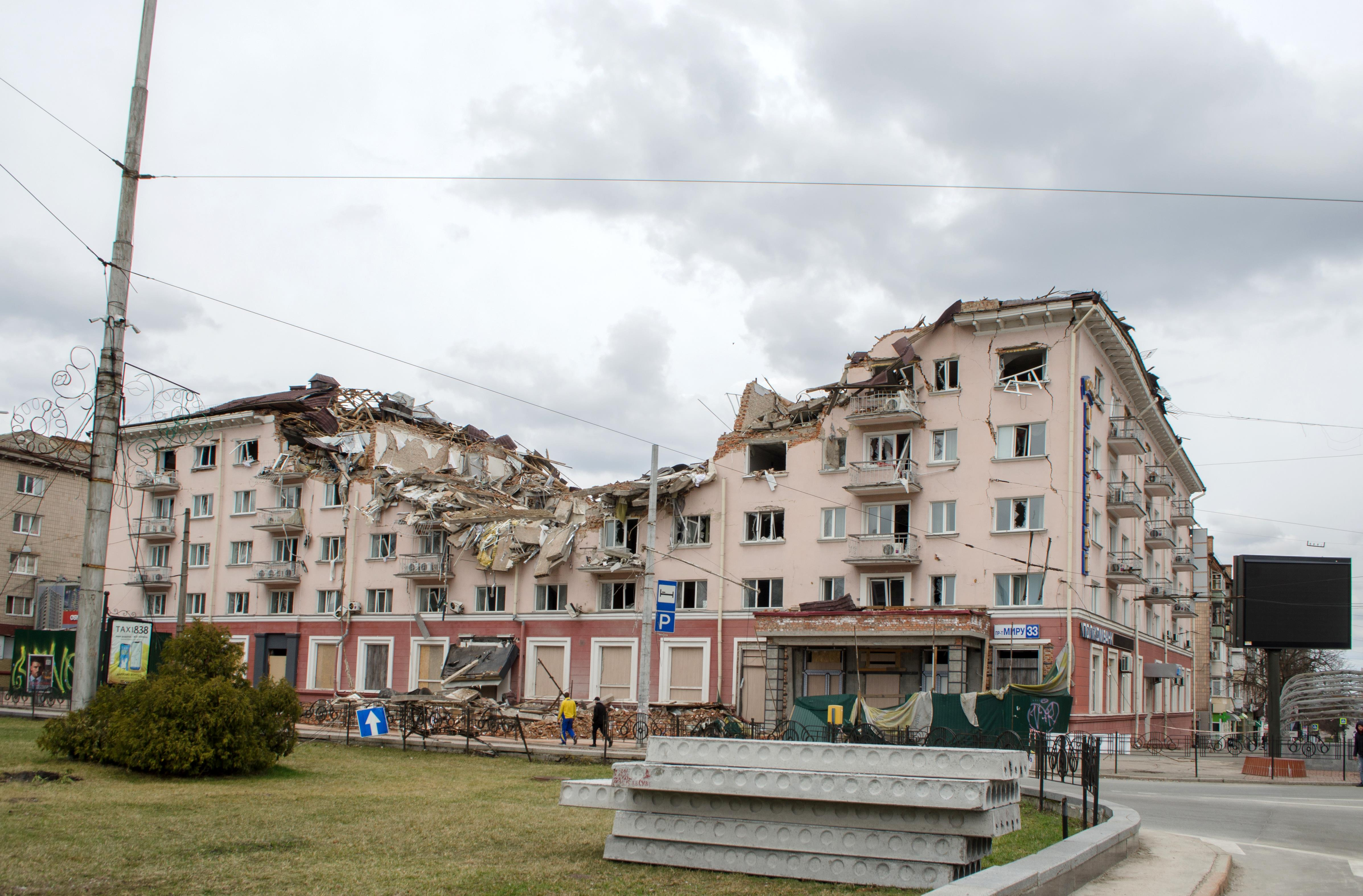
- Ukraine Hotel in Chernihiv after bombardment by Russian forces
Date	24 February – 4 April 2022 (1 month, 1 week and 4 days)
Location	Chernihiv, Ukraine
Result	Ukrainian victory

Belligerents
Russia	Ukraine

Commanders and leaders
	Viktor Nikoliuk

Units involved
41st Combined Arms Army	1st Tank Brigade; 58th Motorized Brigade; 27th NG Regiment Unspecified others

Strength
30,000 troops	2,000 troops initially (1st Tank Brigade); 6,000

Casualties and losses
Per Ukraine (as of 2 March): 132 soldiers killed 200–250 soldiers captured 56 fuel trucks destroyed	Per Ukraine: 300–350 soldiers killed
- 700+ civilians killed, 40 missing

The Siege of Chernihiv was a military engagement in the city of Chernihiv, in Chernihiv Oblast in the north of Ukraine. It began on 24 February 2022, as part of the northern Ukraine offensive, during the 2022 Russian invasion of Ukraine. On 4 April 2022, Ukrainian authorities stated that the Russian military had left Chernihiv Oblast.

The city was about 70% destroyed due to the siege.

== Initial battle ==
Before the invasion, Ukraine's 1st Tank Brigade, numbering 2,000 men, was headquartered at a base in Honcharivske, which was struck by Russian missiles early in the morning of 24 February 2022. Hours into the war, an estimated 30,000 Russian troops began moving towards the city of Chernihiv, crossing the Ukrainian border from three directions. Their plan was to rapidly take Chernihiv to facilitate an advance on Kyiv along the eastern bank of the Dnieper River, according to Ukrainian officials.

Pre-war defense plans called for the Ukrainian military to hold a defensive line between Ripky and Horodnia, about 35 kilometers from the border of Belarus. Due to the speed of the Russian advance, the 1st Tank Brigade failed to reach Ripky in time, and Russian forces managed to reach Velyki Osniaky and Sedniv, 20-25 kilometers from Chernihiv, before encountering resistance.

The first columns of Russian vehicles to approach Chernihiv were ambushed and destroyed by the 1st Tank Brigade on the highway north of the city, stalling the Russian advance and giving the Ukrainians time to prepare defenses. According to Major General Viktor Nikoliuk, commander of Ukraine's Operational Command North, the brigade's first battles took place near Khaliavyn, where five Russian tanks were damaged.

In the afternoon of 24 February, Ukrainian commander-in-chief Valerii Zaluzhnyi announced that a reconnaissance platoon of the Russian 74th Motorized Rifle Brigade had surrendered near Chernihiv, with the unit's commander claiming "nobody thought that we were going to kill".

The same day, the Ukrainian military repelled a Russian attack in Chernihiv and seized Russian equipment and documents. According to the British Ministry of Defence, Russian forces had failed to capture the city and instead opted to bypass the city through an alternative route to Kyiv. Ukrainian officials reported that the Russian forces were heading towards the nearby towns of Sedniv and Semenivka.

== Siege ==
=== February ===
On 25 February 2022, the Russian Ministry of Defense announced that Russian forces had surrounded Chernihiv and were laying siege to the city. The next day, Ukrainian forces claimed the defeat of a Russian military unit that attempted to capture the city. Several Russian tanks were allegedly seized by Ukrainian forces. The Ukrainian government also said that Russian BM-21 Grad multiple rocket launchers (MRL) hit hospitals and kindergartens in Chernihiv, though this claim was not independently verified. That day, an archive of the Security Service of Ukraine (SBU) was bombed by Russian forces.

On 27 February, Ukrainian officials said that Russian forces damaged most of Chernihiv's city center with missiles, and destroyed the historic Shchors cinema. Russian forces later claimed that they had completely blockaded the city. Ukrainian sources also claimed that 56 Russian fuel trucks were destroyed by Ukrainian forces.

On 28 February, the village of Kyinka came under fire. Cluster munitions, repudiated by most countries, were used in the attack. Saboteurs with the support of armored vehicles also tried to break into Chernihiv; they were found and killed in the outskirts of Chernihiv. On this day, the villages of Mykhailo-Kotsiubynske and Shestovytsia came under Russian occupation.

=== March ===
Chernihiv residential building after Russian shelling on 3 March

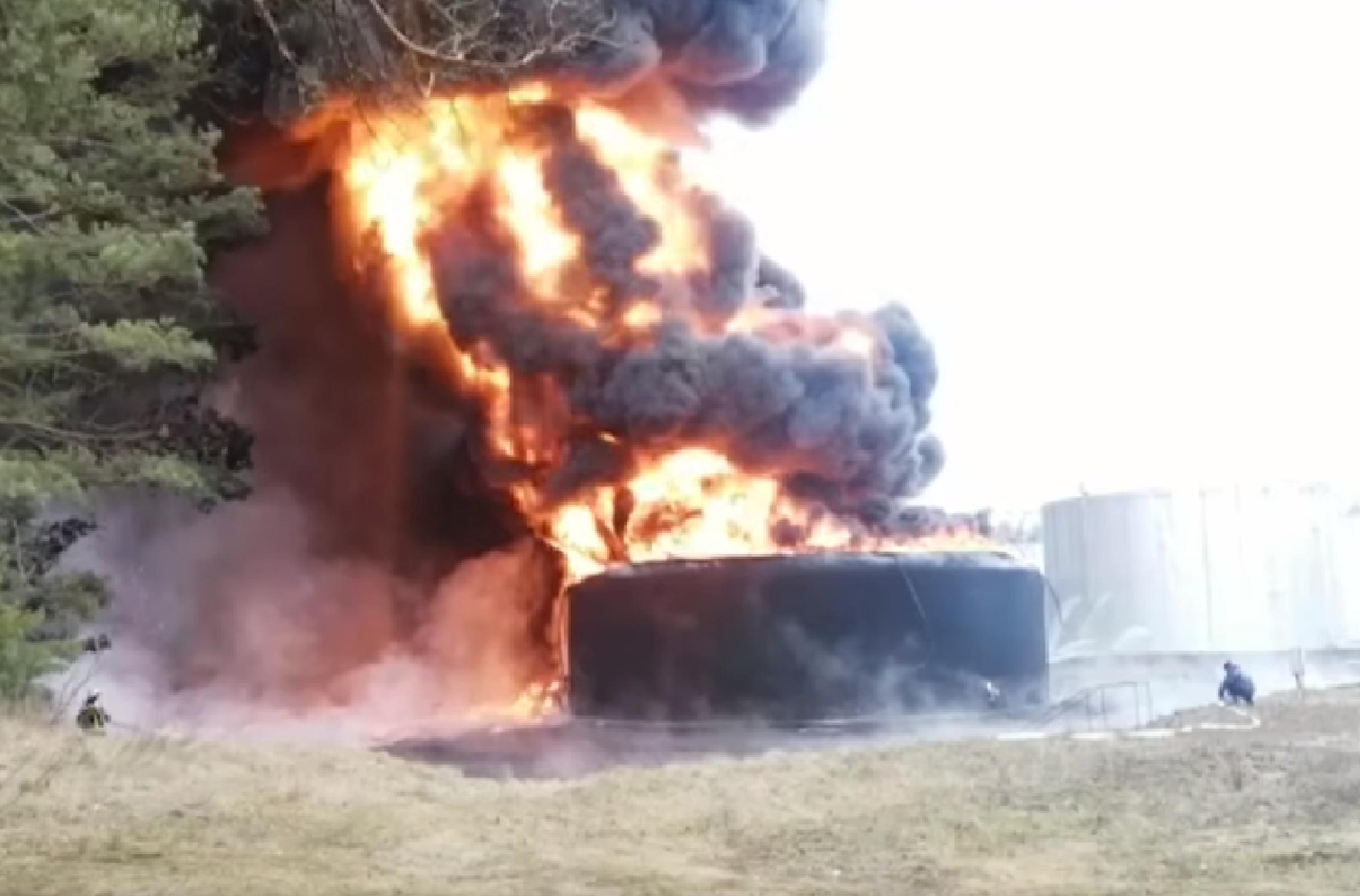
Ukrainian firefighters try to put out diesel fuel tanks attacked by Russia in Chernihiv

On 1 March, Ukrainian officials stated that Belarus joined the Russian invasion and was sending a column of military vehicles towards Chernihiv from the Belarusian city of Grodno. US officials disagreed with this claim, stating that there was "no indication" that Belarus had invaded. Vyacheslav Chaus, the governor of Chernihiv Oblast, stated that every access point to the city was heavily mined.

On 2 March, the mayor of Chernihiv, Vladyslav Atroshenko, predicted that urban warfare in the city was possible. Two missiles hit a hospital in the city during the day, according to the health administration chief Serhiy Pivovar. On 3 March, a Russian airstrike was reported to have hit residential buildings and two schools. Around 47 people were reported killed, and 18 others were injured.

On 2 March, according to historian Oleksandr Yasenchuk, Russian forces were pushed back along the Chernihiv–Sosnytsia highway up until the intersection with the road to Horodnia. North of Chernihiv, he said that Ukrainian forces were holding positions at Khaliavyn. He also claimed that Russian forces had taken control of the long-defunct Chernihiv Shestovytsia Airport due to the fact that they were using old Soviet-era maps.

Between 3-4 March, Russian forces of the 55th Mountain Motor Rifle Brigade managed to cross the Desna River from Shestovytsia to Yahidne, using a pontoon bridge that withstood Ukrainian bombardment. Major General Nikoliuk, who narrowly escaped an ambush in Yahidne, said that the village was burned by Russian troops. Additional roadblocks and fortifications were established on the section of the M01 highway south of Chernihiv, to prevent the Russians from encroaching on the city from their bridgehead. On the night of 4 March, a Ukrainian checkpoint outside of Yahidne was destroyed by Russian mortar shelling, missiles, and airstrikes, forcing the Ukrainians to retreat.

After destroying the checkpoint, Russian troops stormed Ivanivka, Chernihiv Oblast, between 5-8 March, where five BMPs and up to 50 personnel of Ukraine's 58th Motorized Brigade were stationed. The five BMPs were destroyed, and multiple Ukrainian soldiers were killed in action as the unit escaped encirclement and withdrew from Ivanivka. Several Russian attacks on Kolychivka were subsequently repelled, with an armored assault by a Russian mechanized company decisively defeated in the center of the village by a tank detachment of the 58th Brigade and a unit of the National Guard of Ukraine. Ukrainian forces then held Kolychivka for the duration of hostilities.

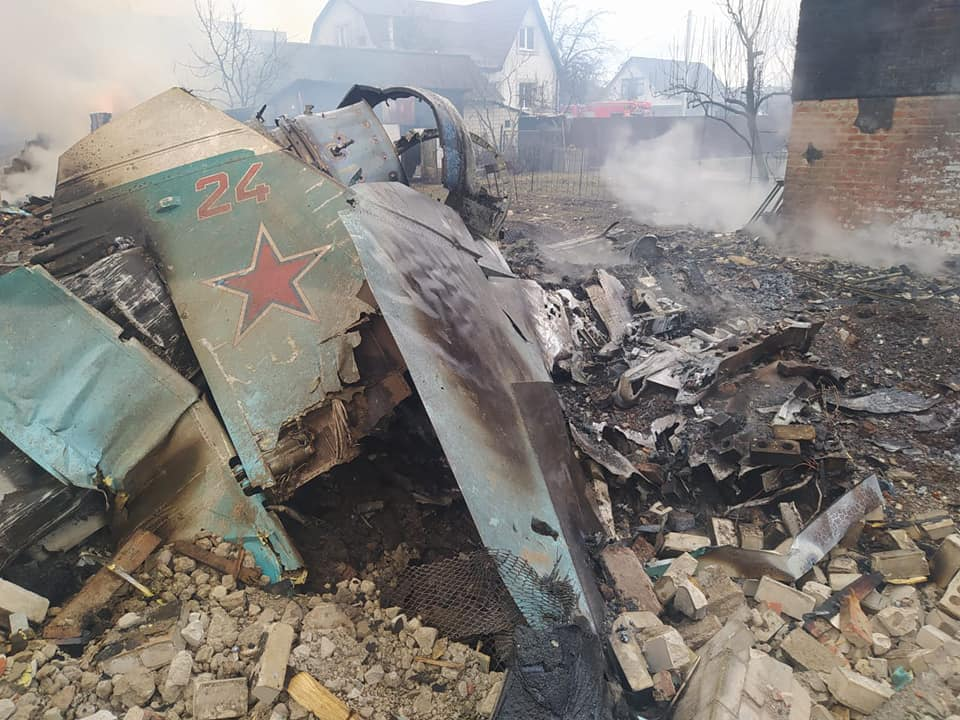
Russian plane shot down on 5 March

On 5 March, on the outskirts of Chernihiv, in Masany, the Ukrainian military shot down a Russian attack aircraft; both pilots were captured. On 6 March, as of the morning, 141 settlements in the region were left without electricity. Attacks continued as the Russian Air Force dropped heavy bombs intended for fortifications on residential buildings. The city received humanitarian aid (food, medicine, etc). Due to the threat of shelling, the trucks were immediately unloaded.

On 10 March, Mayor Vladyslav Atroshenko said that Russian forces had completed the encirclement of Chernihiv, adding that the city was completely isolated and critical infrastructure for its 300,000 residents was rapidly failing as it came under repeated bombardment. A Russian airstrike also damaged the Chernihiv Arena.

On 11 March, the Chernihiv Stadium and a library were badly damaged by a Russian airstrike. The "Hotel Ukraine" building in the city was destroyed on 12 March. Ukrainian forces later claimed to have destroyed a Russian missile unit shelling the city, with some Russian troops surrendering.

On 13 March, a Russian airstrike at 05:46 hit a dormitory, killing five civilians according to the State Emergency Services. A church on the cemetery Yatsevo was destroyed by shelling (about 3,000 graves on this cemetery were also damaged during the siege). Ukrainian forces later claimed to have shot down a Russian fighter jet while it was bombing Chernihiv.

On 14 March, Chaus stated that Russian airstrikes had destroyed the Chernihiv Polytechnic National University. The Office of the Prosecutor General of Ukraine stated that ten civilians were killed during the shelling of the city. Near Chernihiv, the Ukrainian military defeated an enemy tank unit that was to participate in an attack on Kyiv.

On 16 March, a Russian attack killed at least 18 and injured 26 civilians, who were waiting in a line for bread.

On 25 March, Ukrainian authorities said that Russian forces had cut-off the northern city of Chernihiv after destroying a road bridge across the Desna in the south, while attempts to fully encircle the city remained unsuccessful. On 30 March 2022, the Korolenko Chernihiv Regional Universal Scientific Library was bombed, along with the market in the city center. Also a specialized table tennis hall in the Khimik Sport Complex was hit by the Russian army. Russian forces aimed at the sports complex, but the rocket did not reach the building, leaving a funnel on the sports ground nearby. The depth of the funnel reached about ten meters. The Khimik Sport Complex, received severe damage – all the windows were broken, plaster crumbled, tables, floor, ceiling, electrical equipment were damaged. Practically, the center for table tennis became unusable.

=== Russian withdrawal ===
On 31 March, the Ukrainian army recaptured a main road connecting Kyiv and Chernihiv, ending the siege, according to David Axe, citing Twitter users. Chaus and the city's deputy mayor reported that 31 March marked the first quiet night since the war began.

On 1 April, Ukraine claimed that Russian forces were withdrawing from the Chernihiv region. On 31 March, the Ukrainian army reportedly recaptured the village of Shestovytsia, having retaken the village of Sloboda on 30 March. The 58th Brigade's recapture of Sloboda forced the Russians to withdraw from Lukashivka to avoid encirclement; Ukrainian forces entered Lukashivka by 31 March. By 2 April, Ukrainian forces had taken the settlements of Mykhailo-Kotsiubynske, Yahidne, Ivanivka and Zolotynka.

By 3 April, the Ukrainian army had recaptured the village of Kolychivka. as Governor Chaus stated that the Russian military left Chernihiv Oblast, but that it had planted mines in many areas. On 5 April, Russia completed their withdrawal from the Chernihiv Oblast, conclusively ending fighting in the region.

The discovery of abandoned Russian army uniforms in Yahidne, Ladynka, and Zolotynka led Nikoliuk to conclude that Russian forces had changed into civilian clothing and gone into hiding. Russian soldiers hiding out in villages in the region were periodically discovered by the National Guard of Ukraine in the aftermath of the hostilities.

== Aftermath ==
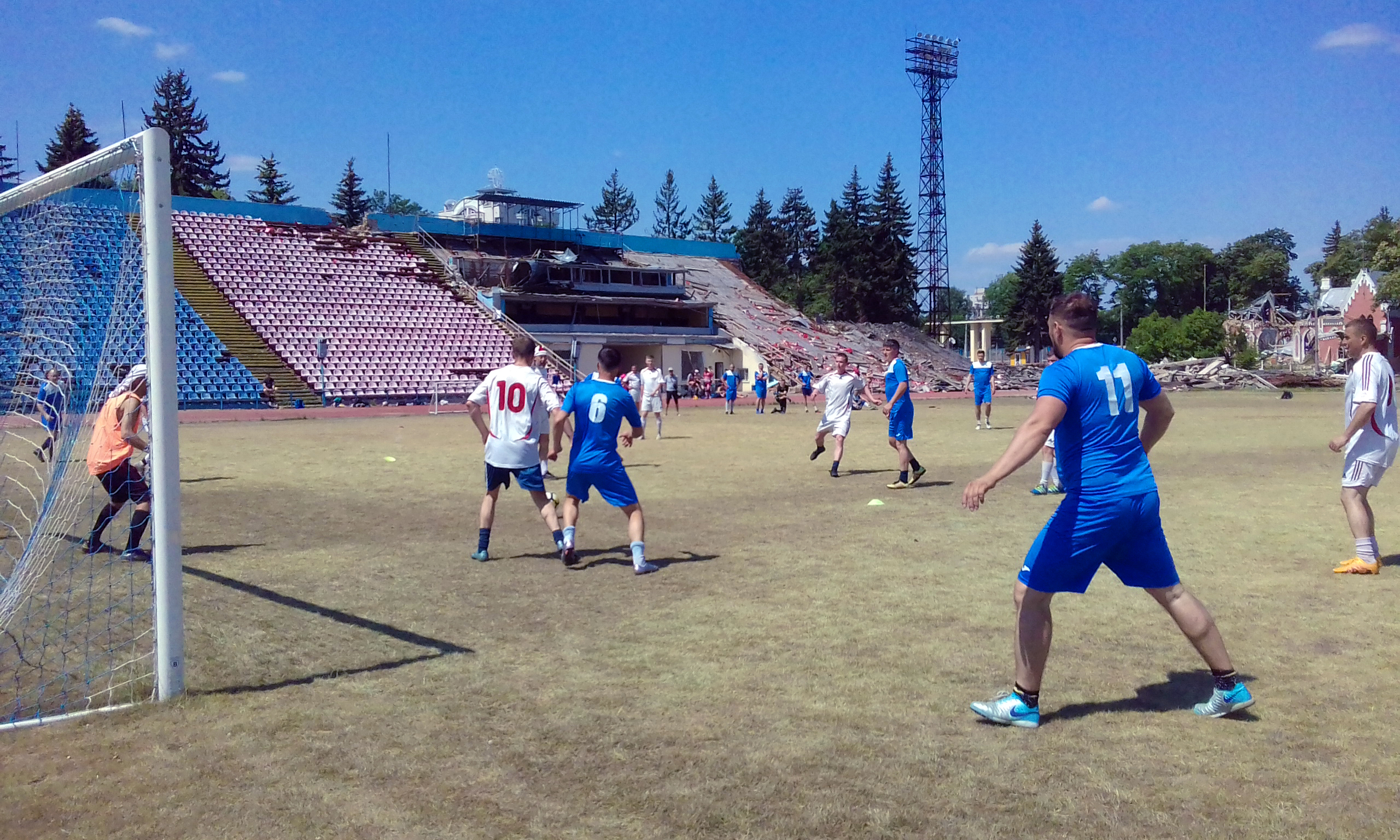
A football match between FC Desna Chernihiv and another local team on the destroyed city stadium 2 months after the end of the siege

On 2 March, The Kyiv Independent reported on a WhatsApp audio message allegedly recorded by a woman from Aleysk, Russia. The woman stated that nearly all of a "tank brigade", part of the 35th Separate Guards Motor Rifle Brigade which is based in Aleysk, had been killed in battle near Chernihiv; only 18 soldiers of the original 150 survived. The woman described the dead soldiers as "mostly very young men". The woman stated that 45 coffins were expected to arrive on the day of her message.

The Chernihiv Regional Prosecutor's Office stated that at least 123 Ukrainian soldiers, 100 civilians and five policemen, had been killed as of 15 March.

On 16 March, Ukrainian and American officials claimed that Russian forces attacked a group of civilians who were waiting in a breadline, killing 10. Chernihiv Oblast governor Vyacheslav Chaus stated on 17 March that 53 people were killed in the city during the previous day alone.

By the end of the siege, more than half of the city's population of almost 300,000 had fled. The total civilian casualty count is unknown; however, the city's mayor Vladyslav Atroshenko told reporters that he estimated 350–400 civilians had been killed with up to 100 people being buried a day. Humanitarian workers claimed the same numbers, but mostly Ukrainian and Russian soldiers. Chernihiv's governor, Vyacheslav Chaus, said that secure evacuation corridors were being hastily established before an anticipated return of Russian forces to the city. Residents of the outlying town of Lukashivka reported Russian forces performed beatings and mock executions, as well as confiscating phones, passports, household items such as carpets and pillows, and executing livestock to harass the locals before the town was recaptured by Ukrainian forces on 1 April.

Despite fully withdrawing from the region in late March, Russian shelling of Chernihiv continued throughout April and May. On 17 May, a Russian missile strike in the Desna region of Chernihiv killed 8 civilians and wounded an additional 12.

In August 2022, a Russian sergeant who was captured by Ukrainian forces was sentenced to ten years' imprisonment for committing war crimes during the siege.

== Analysis ==
According to a Washington Post piece on the battle for Kyiv, the Ukrainian resistance in Chernihiv played a "critical role" in preventing the Russian military from succeeding its assault on the capital. Ukrainska Pravda opined that if Chernihiv had fallen, the defense of Kyiv would have become impossible.

Col. Leonid Khoda, commander of the 1st Tank Brigade, said after the siege that control over a hilltop northeast of Chernihiv was crucial to the defense of the city. It was fiercely contested for several days, with Russian FAB-500 bombs ultimately destroying much of the hill itself.

While Chernihiv was often portrayed in media as a "city under siege", there was a Ukrainian-held "road of life" through the village of Anysiv that connected the city with its southern outskirts, which were defended by the 58th Motorized Infantry Brigade. The destruction of a concentration of Russian armor in Lukashivka proved to be critical in preventing a full siege of Chernihiv.

Khoda said that by mid-March, the Russians were suffering from logistical issues, had accumulated significant losses of personnel and equipment, and no longer had sufficient forces to enter Chernihiv.

== See also ==
- August 2023 Chernihiv missile strike
- Battle of Sumy
- Battle of Kharkiv (2022)
- Siege of Mariupol
