= Mykhailo-Kotsiubynske settlement hromada =

Coordinates: 51°27′00″N 30°51′50″E

Mykhailo-Kotsiubynske settlement hromada Михайло-Коцюбинська селищна громада
- Hromada
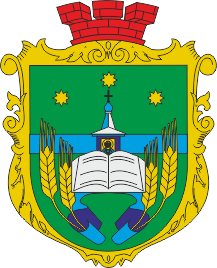
- Coat of arms
- Interactive map of Mykhailo-Kotsiubynske settlement hromada
- Country: Ukraine
- Oblast: Chernihiv
- Raion: Chernihiv

Area
  - Total: 781.0 km^{2} (301.5 sq mi)

Population (2020)
  - Total: 12,487
  - Density: 15.99/km^{2} (41.41/sq mi)
- CATOTTG code: UA74100250000038291
- Settlements: 42
- Rural settlements: 2
- Villages: 39
- Towns: 1
- Website: mkocubynska-gromada.gov.ua

Mykhailo-Kotsiubynske settlement hromada (Ukrainian: Михайло-Коцюбинська селищна громада) is a hromada of Ukraine, located in Chernihiv Raion, Chernihiv Oblast. Its administrative center is the town of Mykhailo-Kotsiubynske.

It has an area of 781.0 square kilometres (301.5 mi^{2}) and a population of 12,487, as of 2020.

== Composition ==
The hromada includes 42 settlements: 1 town (Mykhailo-Kotsiubynske), 39 villages:

- Andriivka
- Antonovichi
- Birky
- Vediltsi
- Hirmanka
- Hlyadyn
- Dniprovske
- Zhidynychi
- Zhukotky
- Zavod
- Zahatka
- Zaitsi
- Karkhivka
- Kovpita
- Kruhle
- Levkovychi
- Levonky
- Lenkiv Kruh
- Linea
- Lhiv
- Lhivka
- Maliyki
- Mnyov
- Moskali
- Pakul
- Papirnya
- Pylnya
- Plohiv
- Povidov
- Prokhoriv
- Pustinky
- Rudnya
- Semeniahivka
- Skuhari
- Staryk
- Khrapate
- Shybyrynivka
- Shmayivka
- Shulhivka

And 2 rural-type settlements: Revuniv Kruh and Tsentralne.

== Geography ==
The Mykhailo-Kotsiubynske settlement hromada is located in the east of Chernihiv Oblast, on the left bank of the Dnieper, near the state border with the Republic of Belarus. The territory of the hromada is located within the Dnieper Lowland. The relief of the surface of the Mykhailo-Kotsiubynske settlement hromada is a lowland plain, there are oxbow lake and artificial lakes in the floodplain of the river.

The climate of Mykhailo-Kotsiubynske settlement hromada is moderately continental, with warm summers and relatively mild winters. The average temperature in January is about -7°C, and in July - +19°C. The average annual precipitation ranges from 550 to 660 mm, with the highest precipitation in the summer period.

The most common are sod-podzolic soils.The Mykhailo-Kotsiubynskesettlement hromada is located in the natural zone of mixed forests, in Polissya. The main species in the forests are pine, oak, birch.

Regional highways pass through the hromada.The railway from Slavutych to Chernihiv runs through the northern part of the community.The hromada has developed agriculture, wood processing, and food production.

== See also ==
- List of hromadas of Ukraine
