= 27th National Guard Regiment (Ukraine) =

27th Separate NG Regiment
- 27-й окремий НГ полк (Ukrainian)
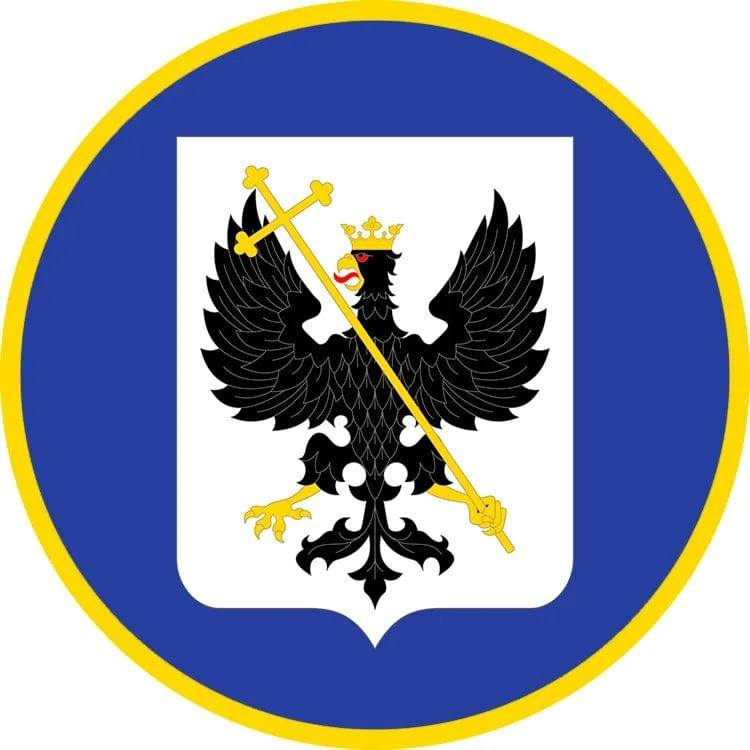
- Insignia
- Founded: 2019
- Country: Ukraine
- Branch: National Guard of Ukraine
- Type: Regiment
- Role: Protection of Ukrainian territorial integrity
- Garrison/HQ: Chernihiv
- Patron: Sviatoslav II Yaroslavich
- Engagements: Russo-Ukrainian war: Russian invasion of Ukraine; Northern Ukraine campaign; Siege of Chernihiv

Commanders
- Current commander: Colonel Ihor Serhiyovych Orynko

The 27th National Guard Regiment named after Prince Sviatoslav Yaroslavich is a regiment of the National Guard of Ukraine tasked with the protection of Ukrainian territorial integrity. It was established as the 22nd battalion on the basis of the 3rd battalion of the 27th Pechersk Brigade in 2019. It is headquartered in Chernihiv.

== History ==
The regiment was established in December 2019 as the 22nd Separate Battalion, in Chernihiv, on the basis of the 3rd battalion of the 27th Pechersk Brigade.

During the Russian invasion of Ukraine in 2022, the 22nd separate battalion of the National Guard of Ukraine was expanded and enlarged becoming the 27th National Guard Regiment.

The regiment took part in the Northern Ukraine campaign and was one of the first units to engage Russian troops on ground during the Siege of Chernihiv for which the personnel of the regiment were awarded multiple awards. On 30 September 2025, the unit was awarded the honorary title "named after Prince Sviatoslav Yaroslavich" by decree of President Volodymyr Zelenskyy.

== Structure ==
- 27th National Guard Regiment
  - Management and Headquarters
  - Command Center
  - Rifle Company
  - 1st Patrol Company
  - 2nd Patrol Company
  - Automobile Company
  - Support Company
    - Canine Group
    - Communication Node

== Commanders ==
- Colonel Andriy Savchuk (2019-2021)
- Colonel Ihor Serhiyovych Orynko (2021-)

== Sources ==
- ВІЙСЬКОВА ЧАСТИНА 3 82 НАЦІОНАЛЬНОЇ ГВАРДІЇ УКРАЇНИ
- Черкащан запрошують служити у лавах Національної гвардії України
- Резервісти чернігівського батальйону Національної гвардії їдуть до однієї з найгарячіших країни точок
- У Чернігові відділ комплектування провів професійно-орієнтаційні та іміджеві заходи
- У Чернігові привітали військовослужбовців 3-го батальйону військової частини 3066 Національної гвардії України
