= 3 March 2022 Chernihiv bombing =

Incident during the 2022 Russian invasion of Ukraine

- Part of the Siege of Chernihiv
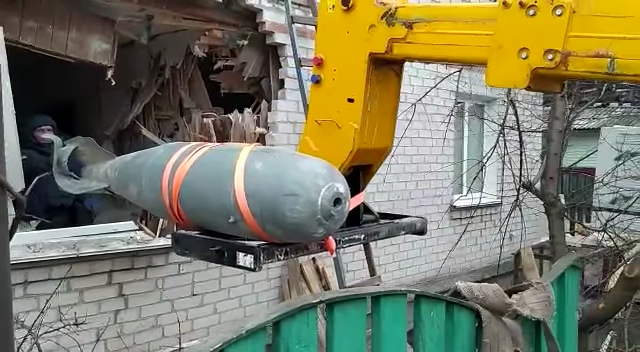
- Unexploded Russian bomb being removed from a building in Chernihiv
- Location: Chernihiv, Ukraine
- Date: 3 March 2022; 12:15 PM
- Attack type: Airstrike
- Deaths: 47
- Injuries: 18
- Perpetrator: Russian Armed Forces

Houses on Chornovil Street after the bombing

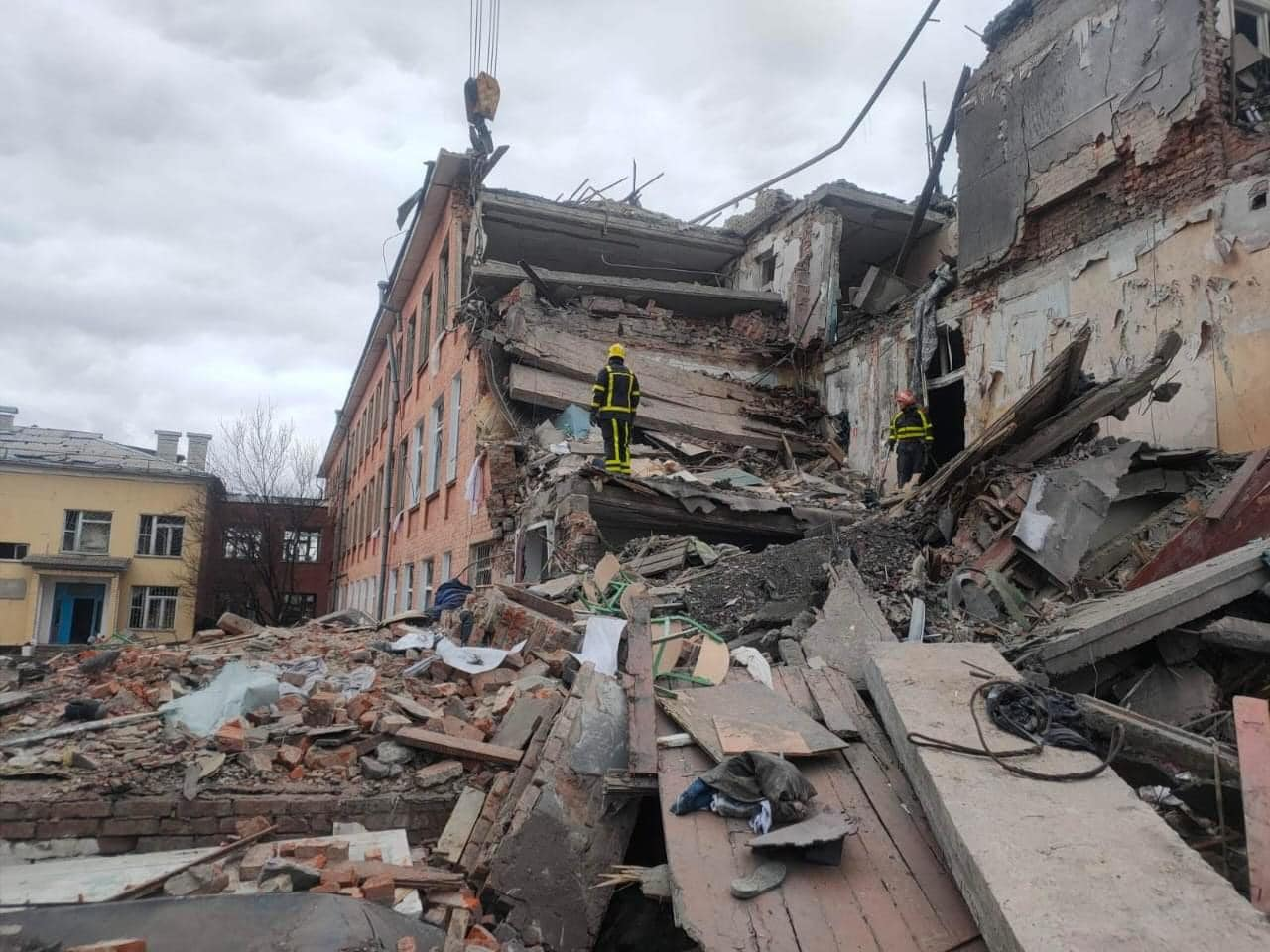
School №18, bombed the same day

On 3 March 2022, 47 people were killed in a series of airstrikes in Chernihiv by Russian forces during the siege of the city, during the Russian invasion of Ukraine. Amnesty International and Human Rights Watch described the strikes as a war crime.

== Attack ==
On 3 March 2022, just after 12:00 (UTC+2), six unguided aerial bombs were filmed falling in a residential area in Chernihiv, in a triangular public square formed by Viacheslava Chornovila and Kruhova streets (51.5001°N 31.2791°E). Analysis by Amnesty International found that (at least) eight bombs fell. A witness living in Ivana Bohuna Street, Alina, heard a loud buzzing sound before the bombs exploded.

The film of the attack was recorded on a dashboard camera (dashcam). The film shows the six bombs falling and an explosion. Other online media was published showing bodies of the victims, survivors being carried away on stretchers, firemen trying to put out fires in the main apartment complex that had been hit, and cars and trees on fire. Regional Governor Viacheslav Chaus told reporters that two schools were hit.

Ukrainian-born United States Congresswoman Victoria Spartz (IN-R) told reporters that her grandmother lived in a building nearby and the windows had all been destroyed.

The same day, two schools (№18 and №21) and 8 private houses were destroyed, and 7 more houses heavily damaged, in another place in Chernihiv, in the vicinity of Biloruskyi Lane.

== Victims ==
Yulia Matvienko, also an Ivana Bohuna Street resident, survived the bombing with a head injury. Her three children were uninjured, but had to crawl out from under the rubble after the explosion. Local emergency services recorded 38 men and 9 women killed by the bombing and 18 people injured.

== Investigations ==
As Amnesty International was unable to identify a legitimate military target nearby, it said the attack could be a war crime of the invasion.

Human Rights Watch (HRW) found no evidence of a "significant [military] target in or near the intersection when it was hit, ... pointing to a potentially deliberate or reckless indiscriminate attack." HRW called for the International Criminal Court investigation in Ukraine and the United Nations Commission of Inquiry to decide if a war crime had occurred and to hold to account the people responsible. The HRW investigation included telephone interviews with three witnesses and two other Chernihiv residents, and analysis of 22 videos and 12 photographs. The witnesses interviewed by HRW stated that they were unaware of military targets or operations in the neighbourhood.

A bomb crater consistent with a 500 kg bomb was found. FAB-500 bombs were known to be used in the 2022 Russian invasion.

== See also ==
- 16 March 2022 Chernihiv breadline attack
- August 2023 Chernihiv missile strike
- War crimes in the Russian invasion of Ukraine
