= 16 March 2022 Chernihiv breadline attack =

Russian shelling during the Russian invasion of Ukraine

Coordinates: 51.519492°N 31.326622°E

- Part of the Siege of Chernihiv
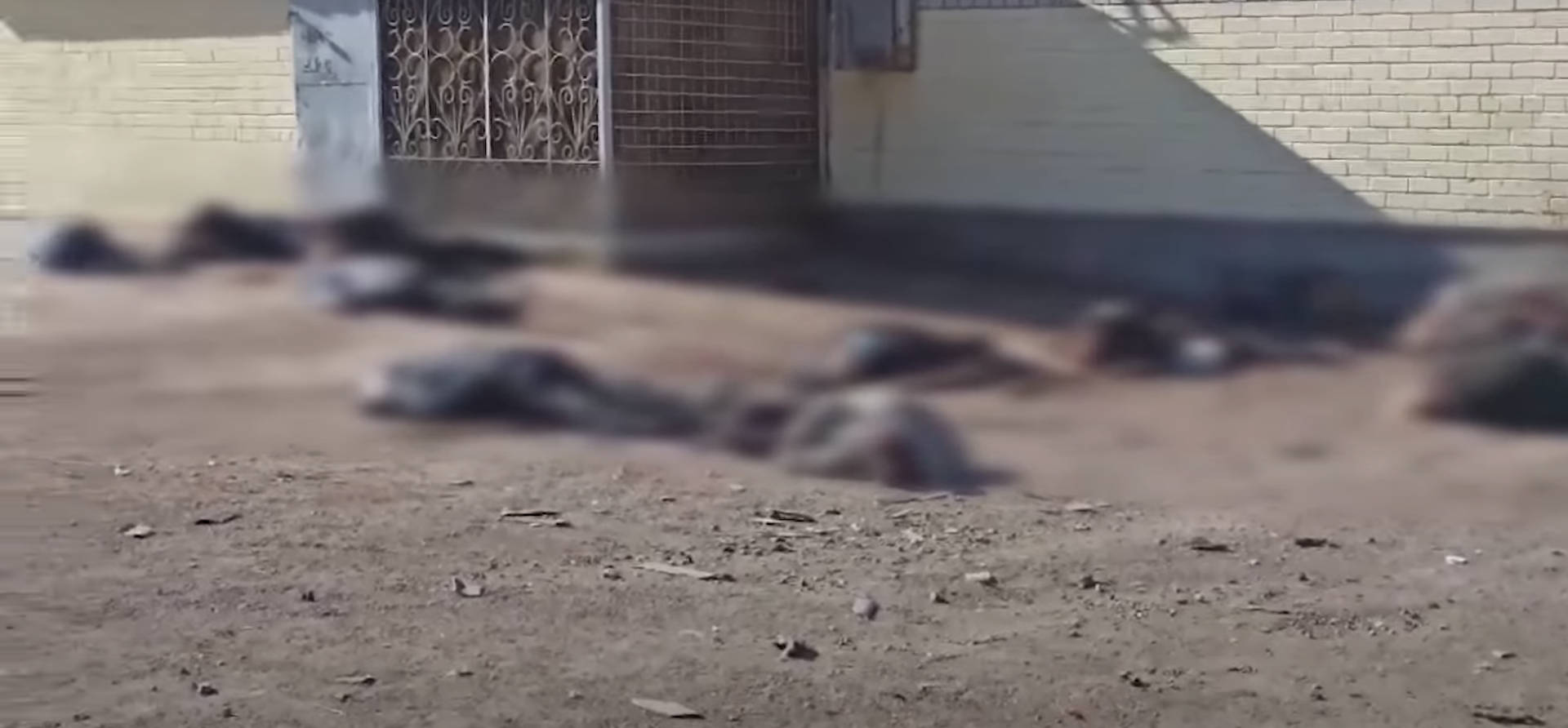
- Civilians killed in the attack
- Location: Chernihiv, Ukraine
- Date: 16 March 2022; Around 10:00 (UTC+2)
- Target: Civilians in Chernihiv
- Deaths: 18
- Injuries: 26
- Perpetrator: Russian Armed Forces

On 16 March 2022, a Russian attack killed at least 18 and injured 26 civilians in Chernihiv, Ukraine, who were waiting in a line for bread.

== Background ==
The Ukrainian city of Chernihiv has seen attacks by Russian forces since 24 February 2022, the day in which the Russian invasion of Ukraine started. The battles of Chernihiv have caused heavy civilian losses. On 3 March, the city suffered a bombing that killed 47 people. Russian major general Andrei Sukhovetsky, then deputy commander of the 41st Combined Arms Army, was killed on 4 March, the day after the bombing, becoming the first Russian general to die during the Russian invasion. On 10 March, the city entered a siege which lasted until 31 March when the Ukrainian forces managed to undo the encirclement of the city.

As fighting continued, more civilians died in Chernihiv. On 16 March, the Governor of Chernihiv Oblast Vyacheslav Chaus reported that the Russian attacks on Chernihiv on that day alone had killed a total of 53 people.

== Attack ==
The event was reported by Chaus as well as the United States Embassy in Kyiv. On Ukrainian television, Chaus said the attack, which he described as a bombing, was "not the first such incoming shell, nor is it the first shelling of civilians by the enemy". The US Embassy reported that the people had been "shot and killed". 18 people were reported dead by local authorities. The incident happened at around 10:00 UTC+3. Victims of the incident were killed following a blast shot from heavy artillery. These civilians were unarmed and some of them survived the shelling; they were taken to medical facilities by Chernihiv police.

External videos
- Video of the aftermath

James Whitney Hill, a 67-year-old US citizen from Minnesota was killed in the attack. Chernihiv Patrol Police and the US State Department confirmed the death of a US citizen. James, known on social media as "Jimmy Hill", was an English-language teacher and refused to leave Ukraine when the war started to provide care for his partner Iryna, a Ukrainian citizen.

== Reactions ==
Around four hours after the incident, the Chernihiv Regional Prosecutor's Office filed a legal case regarding the attack. The Chernihiv Oblast branch of the Security Service of Ukraine also started an investigation.

== See also ==
- 3 March 2022 Chernihiv bombing
- August 2023 Chernihiv missile strike
- War crimes in the Russian invasion of Ukraine
