= Mykhailo-Kotsiubynske =

Rural locality in Chernihiv Oblast, Ukraine

Mykhailo-Kotsiubynske Михайло-Коцюбинське
- Rural settlement
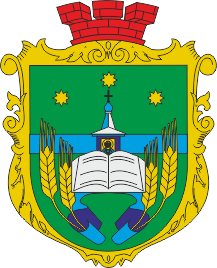
- Flag Coat of arms

- Location within Chernihiv Oblast Location within Ukraine
- Coordinates: 51°27′18″N 31°04′38″E
- Country: Ukraine
- Oblast: Chernihiv Oblast
- Raion: Chernihiv Raion

Population (2022)
  - Total: 2,797
  - Estimate (2025): 2,712
- Time zone: UTC+2 (EET)
  - Summer (DST): UTC+3 (EEST)

Mykhailo-Kotsiubynske (Ukrainian: Михайло-Коцюбинське; Russian: Миха́йло-Коцюби́нское) is a rural settlement in Chernihiv Raion, Chernihiv Oblast, northern Ukraine. It hosts the administration of Mykhailo-Kotsiubynske settlement hromada, one of the hromadas of Ukraine. Population: 2,797 (2022 estimate).

== History ==
The settlement was first mentioned in written sources in 1667. Originally known as Kozel (Ukrainian: Козел), in 1935, the village was renamed in honor of Ukrainian writer Mykhailo Kotsiubynsky.

Until 26 January 2024, Mykhailo-Kotsiubynske was designated urban-type settlement. On this day, a new law entered into force which abolished this status, and Mykhailo-Kotsiubynske became a rural settlement.

== Geography ==
The Mykhailo-Kotsiubynske is located in the east of Chernihiv Oblast, about 10 kilometres (6.2 mi) west of the city of Chernihiv. It is located within the Dnieper Lowland. The relief of the surface of the Mykhailo-Kotsiubynske is a lowland plain, there are oxbow lake and artificial lakes in the floodplain of the river.

The climate of Mykhailo-Kotsiubynske is moderately continental, with warm summers and relatively mild winters. The average temperature in January is about -7 °C, and in July - +19 °C. The average annual precipitation ranges from 550 to 660 mm, with the highest precipitation in the summer period.

The most common are sod-podzolic soils.The Mykhailo-Kotsiubynske is located in the natural zone of mixed forests, in Polissya. The main species in the forests are pine, oak, birch.

The hromada has developed agriculture, wood processing, and food production.

== Economy ==
=== Transportation ===
The closest railway station is Levkovychi, a couple of kilometers north of the settlement, on the railway line connecting Chernihiv and Slavutych.

Regional highways pass through the Mykhailo-Kotsiubynske. Settlement is on a road which runs from Chernihiv to the west, crosses into Belarus and proceeds to Mazyr.
