= Road bridge across the Desna (Chernihiv) =

Bridge in Chernihiv, northern Ukraine

- Coordinates: 51°27′27″N 31°18′05″E
- Carried: Motor vehicles and Pedestrians
- Crossed: Desna
- Locale: Chernihiv, Chernihiv Oblast Ukraine
- Other name: Kyiv Bridge

Characteristics
- Material: Reinforced concrete
- Total length: 875 m
- Width: 7 m

History
- Construction start: 1859
- Collapsed: 2022

Location
- Interactive map of Road bridge across the Desna

The Kyiv Bridge (Ukrainian: Київський міст, romanized: Kyjivs'kyj mist) or the Road bridge across the Desna (Ukrainian: Автомобільний міст через ріку Десну) is a currently destroyed brick-and-stone bridge over the Desna River in Chernihiv, Ukraine, located along Peace (Myru) Avenue (Ukrainian: Проспект Миру).

== History ==
The bridge was built in 1859 as part of the construction of the Odesa-Kyiv-Chernihiv-St. Petersburg highway. Prior to that, the left bank of the Desna was crossed by ferry, which was located at a dump one verst upstream from the location of the bridge. During large floods, part of the highway would flood and traffic would temporarily stop. In 1877, a section of the bridge was even demolished by water, and was subsequently reconstructed in the late 19th - early 20th centuries. In 1893, a station on the Chernihiv-Kruty narrow-gauge railway was built on the left bank near the bridge. In January 1919, there was a battle between the kurins of the Directorate of the Ukrainian People's Republic and of the Bohunsky Regiment of the Ukrainian Soviet Army near the bridge. After World War II, the bridge did not meet the needs of vehicles, so in 1956 a new bridge was put into operation a little lower downstream from the previous one, and the old one was dismantled. Over time, its bandwidth was also insufficient, thus in 1986 a new bridge over the Desna near the village of Shestovytsya in Chernihiv Raion was put into operation, which was designated to be used by transit vehicles.

On the night of March 22-23, 2022, amid the Russo-Ukrainian war, the bridge was destroyed during the siege of Chernihiv - as a result of an air strike (according to other sources - by order of the local mayor and Vyacheslav Chaus, the Head of the Chernihiv Regional Military Administration). The bridge had been used to evacuate citizens and deliver humanitarian goods.

On July 5, 2023, a temporary replacement bridge was opened to traffic with some weight limitations. A permanent replacement bridge is expected to open in 2024.

== General data ==
The total length of the bridge was 875 m, width - 7 m. The height of the bottom of the truss above the water level - 18 m. Load capacity - 80 t. The bridge consisted of a two-lane road and pedestrian paths on both sides.
