= August 2023 Chernihiv missile strike =

Incident during the Russian invasion of Ukraine

19 August 2023 Chernihiv bombing
- Part of Attacks on civilians in the Russian invasion of Ukraine
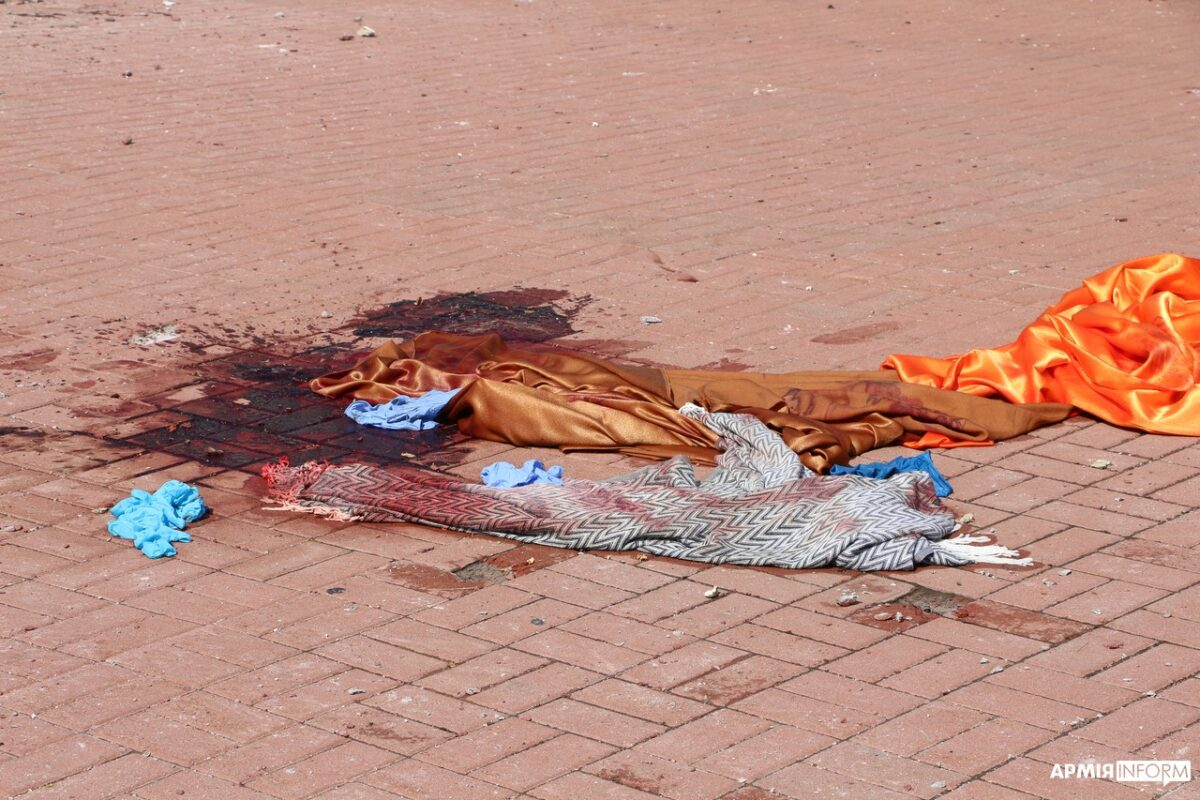
- Blood of a victim on the ground in Chernihiv after the missile attack
- Location: Chernihiv, Ukraine
- Date: 19 August 2023
- Attack type: Airstrike
- Deaths: 7
- Injuries: 144+
- Perpetrator: Russia

On 19 August 2023, Russian military forces launched an Iskander-M ballistic missile at the Taras Shevchenko Theater in downtown Chernihiv, Ukraine.

== Events ==
The theater was hosting an exhibition on the use of consumer drones in the Russian Invasion of Ukraine, titled "Lyuti Ptashky" (Angry Birds), which was described by its organisers as "a closed meeting of engineers, military and volunteers." Governor of Chernihiv Oblast, Vyacheslav Chaus, announced that 7 were dead, including a 6-year-old girl. Another 144 were injured, including 15 children and 15 policemen, with 41 injuries being grievous and requiring medical evacuations to a hospital.

Earlier in the day Russian President Vladimir Putin, met with his top generals in Rostov-on-Don while Ukrainian President Volodymyr Zelenskyy, was in Sweden for discussions of the import of Saab JAS 39 Gripens to Ukraine. In an address, Zelenskyy called the attack "vile" and that “I am sure our soldiers will give a response to Russia for this terrorist attack,” promising a “a notable response” to Russia in the coming days.

Mayor Oleksandr Lomako announced a three day of mourning in the city for the victims of the attack. The strike occurred during the Orthodox holiday of the Transfiguration of the Lord, and certain locals were going to morning church services in Chernihiv. UN's humanitarian coordinator for Ukraine, Denise Brown, condemned Russia for attacking civilians: "I condemn this repeated pattern of Russian strikes on populated areas of Ukraine... Attacks directed against civilians or civilian objects are strictly prohibited under international humanitarian law".

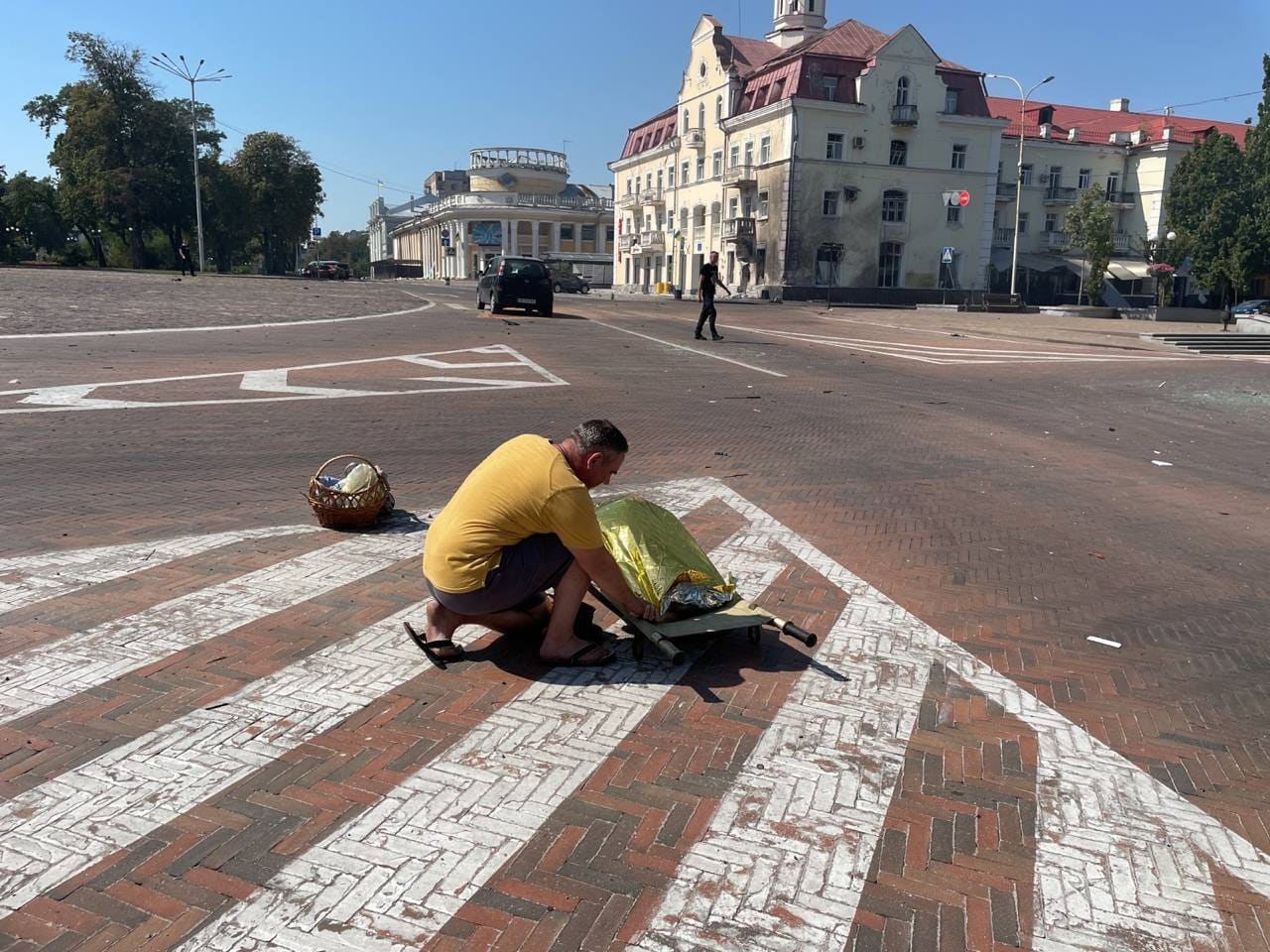

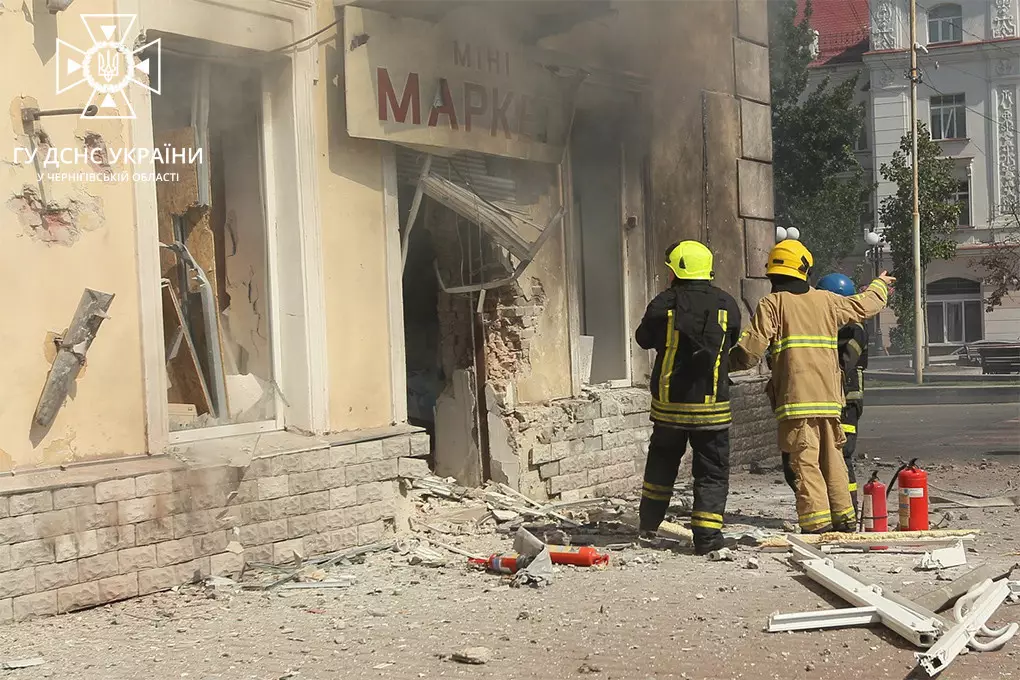

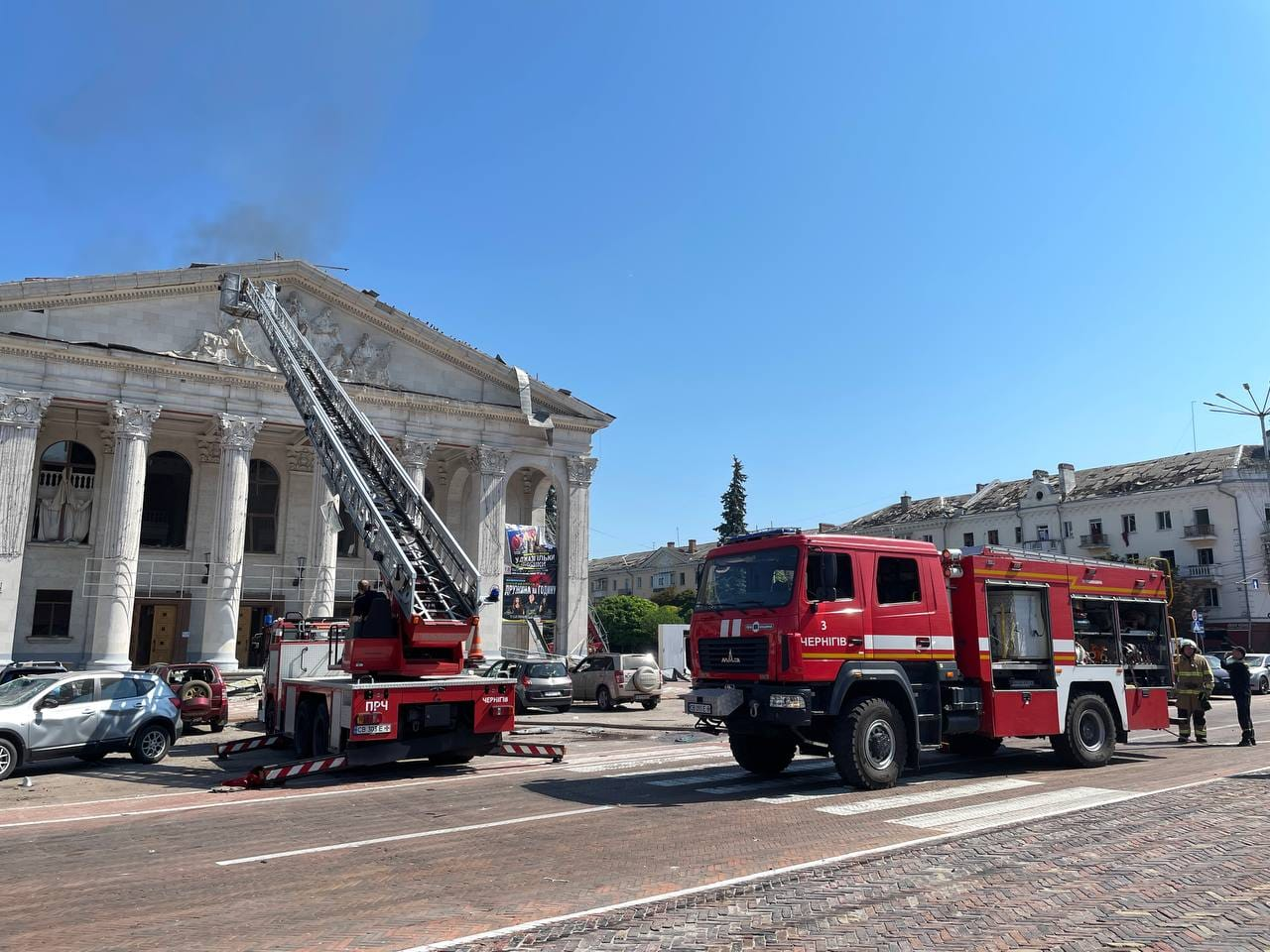

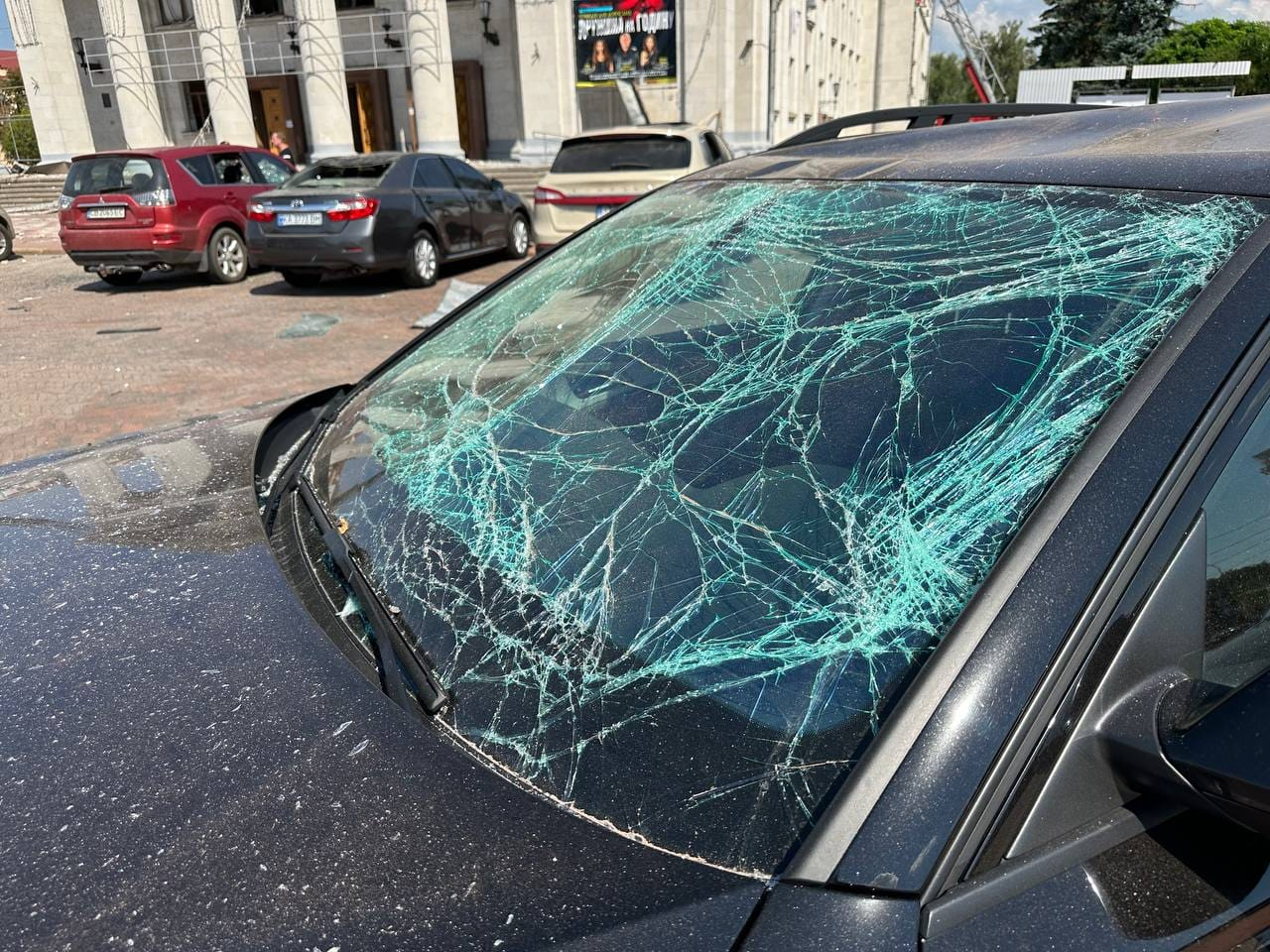

== Aftermath ==
On 30 November 2024, the Security Service of Ukraine charged Colonel-General Yevgeny Nikiforov, the commander of the “West” grouping of the Russian military, in absentia for ordering the attack.

== See also ==
- Russian war crimes
- Lyman cluster bombing
- 2023 Kramatorsk restaurant missile strike
