= Gary (given name) =

Gary or Garry
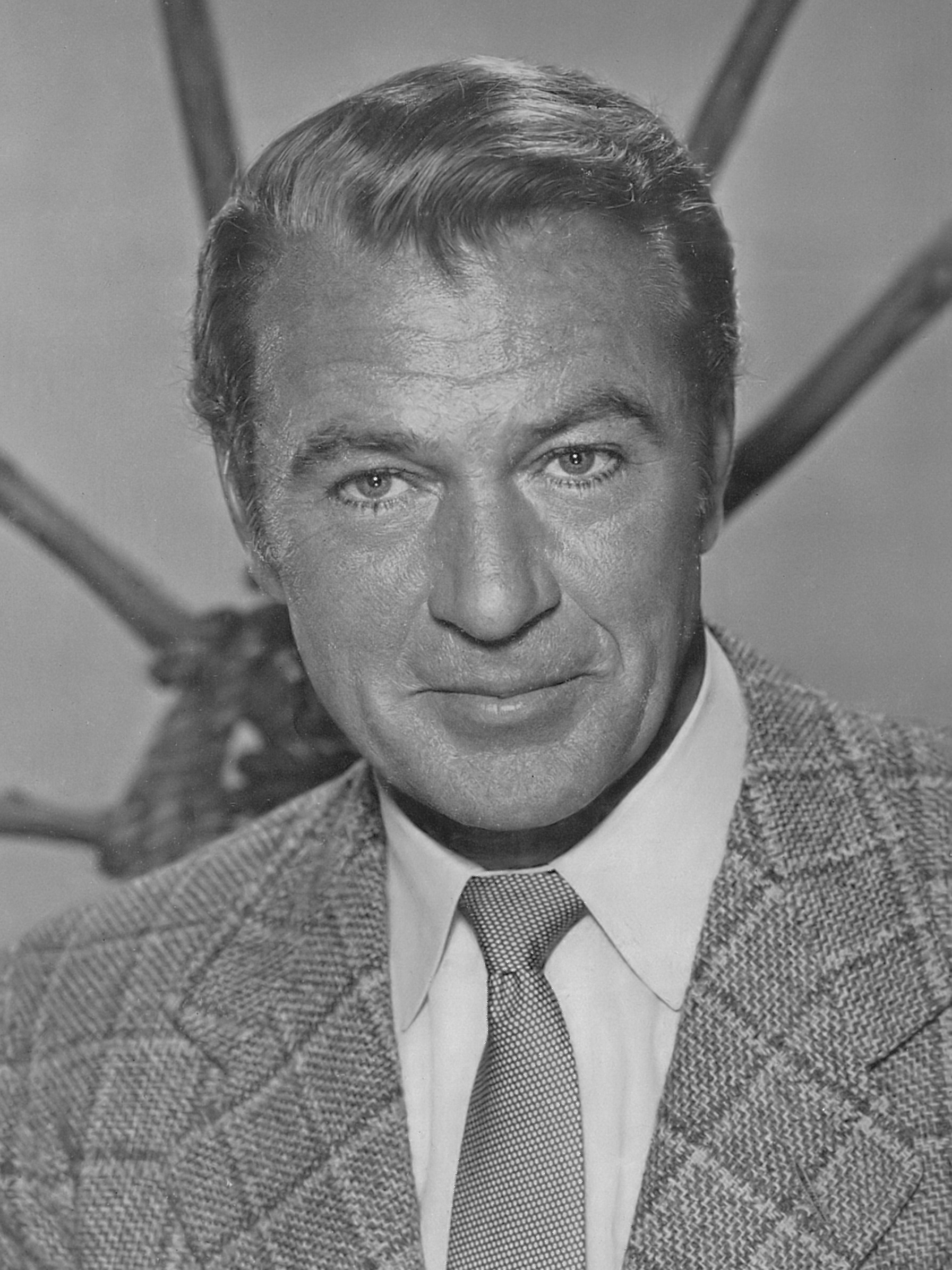
- Gary Cooper in 1952
- Pronunciation: /ˈɡær.ɪ/
- Gender: Male

Origin
- Language: Germanic language
- Meaning: Spear, Spear king

Other names
- Alternative spelling: Garey
- Variant form: none
- Nicknames: Gaz, Gazza, Gal,

Gary and Garry are English language masculine given names.

== Etymology ==
Gary is likely derived from the Norman French name Geiree, itself descended from the Old Frankish name Geiserich, composed of two elements: "*gaizaz" (spear, pike, javelin) plus "*rīkijaz" (kingly, royal).

A variant form of Gary is Garry, the spelling of which has been influenced by that of Barry. An informal pet form of Gary is Gaz, a variant of which is Gazza.

A given name associated with Gary and Garry is Garrison; the latter is sometimes borne by sons of men bearing the former names. The Gaelic Garaidh is also associated with Gary.

Because of the "Gare" sound at the beginning in American English, Gary is sometimes reinterpreted as a diminutive of Garrett, although the names are unrelated.

== History ==
The usage of Gary as a given name is intertwined with the success of the actor Gary Cooper (1901–1961). The American industrialist Elbert Henry Gary left his name to the town of Gary, Indiana. The theatrical agent Nan Collins, who lived in this town, suggested the name Gary to Frank Cooper, one of her clients, who went on to have a successful film career as Gary Cooper.

According to the Social Security Administration, Gary was relatively rare as a given name in the 1900–1920s period (e.g., in the 1910s it was the 677th most frequent name, given to less than 0.01% of the babies born in that decade). In the 1930s, 0.38% of the male babies in the United States were named Gary, and in the 1950s as many as 1.54% of them were given this name, making it the 12th most popular given name of that decade. The name reached its record popularity (9th place) in 1954, the year after Cooper received his Best Actor Academy Award for his leading role in High Noon. Since then, the popularity of Gary as a given name in the United States has been on a slow but steady decline. In the 1990s, the name was the 170th most popular, given to around 0.1% of newborn males.

In the United Kingdom, the name's popularity was assisted in the later 20th century by the prominence of cricket player Gary Sobers (whose first name was a pet form of Garfield), association football player Gary Lineker, and musician Gary Glitter (originally Paul Gadd). Its popularity peaked during the 1960s (it was the 16th most popular male name in 1964) and still ranked as high as 26th in 1984, but by the 1990s had fallen out of the top 100. In 2013, only 28 babies born in England and Wales were named Gary, leading Garys to be labeled a "dying breed".

== People ==
=== Frequent combinations ===
- Gary Anderson (disambiguation)
- Gary Barnett (disambiguation)
- Gary Beck (disambiguation)
- Gary Cohen (disambiguation)
- Gary Cohn (disambiguation)
- Gary Coleman (disambiguation)
- Gary Cooper (disambiguation)
- Gary Davies (disambiguation)
- Gary Davis (disambiguation)
- Gary Gill (disambiguation)
- Gary Gilmore (disambiguation)
- Gary Graham (disambiguation)
- Gary Hart (disambiguation)
- Gary Hill (disambiguation)
- Gary Hughes (disambiguation)
- Gary Johnson (disambiguation)
- Gary Knight (disambiguation)
- Gary Locke (disambiguation)
- Gary Marx (disambiguation)
- Gary Matthews (disambiguation)
- Gary Mitchell (disambiguation)
- Gary Moore (disambiguation)
- Gary Morgan (disambiguation)
- Gary Owen (disambiguation)
- Gary Patterson (disambiguation)
- Gary Peters (disambiguation)
- Gary Ross (disambiguation)
- Gary Russell (disambiguation)
- Gary Schwartz (disambiguation)
- Gary Shapiro (disambiguation)
- Gary Sheffield (disambiguation)
- Gary Stern (disambiguation)
- Gary Stewart (disambiguation)
- Gary Webb (disambiguation)
- Gary Williams (disambiguation)
- Gary Wilson (disambiguation)
- Gary Wood (disambiguation)
- Gary Wright (disambiguation)
- Senator Gary (disambiguation)

=== Computer science, engineering, science and medicine ===
- Gary Becker, American economist
- Gary Evans, Psychologist and professor of Human Ecology in the Cornell University College of Human Ecology
- Gary Fisher, one of the inventors of the modern mountain bike
- Gary Kildall, American computer scientist, microcomputer entrepreneur
- Gary Kreps, American health and risk communication scholar
- Gary McKinnon, Scottish systems administrator, hacker
- Garry Newman, founder of British video game developer Facepunch Studios, namesake of the popular game Garry's Mod.

=== Entertainment ===
- Gary Bautell, American military radio broadcaster
- Gary Brolsma, Internet celebrity
- Gary Burghoff, American actor
- Gary Busey, American actor
- Gary Cole, American television and film actor
- Gary Coleman (1968–2010), American actor
- Gary Collins, American television and film actor
- Gary Cooper, American film actor
- Gary Davies, English radio broadcaster
- Gary Dell'Abate, American radio producer, television host
- Gary Dourdan, American actor
- Gary Farmer, Canadian actor
- Gary LeRoi Gray, American actor
- Gary Lucy, British actor
- Garry Marshall (1934–2016), American television producer
- Garry Moore, American actor and television personality
- Gary Oldman, English actor, filmmaker, musician
- Gary Ross, American writer, director, actor
- Garry Shandling (1949–2016), American actor and comedian
- Gary Sinise, American actor, film director, musician
- Gary Waldhorn (1943–2022), English actor
- Gary Winick, American film director, producer

=== Law, military, and community service ===
- Gary Born, international lawyer and academic
- Gary L. Francione, American legal scholar
- Gary Gordon, American military sniper and Medal of Honor recipient
- Gary Peller (born 1955), American academic and lawyer
- Gary E. Stevenson (born 1955), American religious leader

=== Literature and the arts ===
- Gary Arndt, American travel photographer
- Gary Gygax, American writer and game designer
- Gary "Garrison" Keillor, American writer
- Gary Larson, American cartoonist
- Gary M. Reynolds (born 1952), American founder of GMR Marketing
- Gary Saunders (born 1935), Canadian writer and artist
- Gary Snyder, American poet
- Garry Trudeau, American cartoonist
- Gary Younge (born 1969), British journalist, author, broadcaster and academic

=== Musicians ===
- Gary Barber, English singer songwriter
- Gary Barlow, English singer-songwriter
- Garry Gary Beers, Australian bassist, INXS
- Gary Brooker, English singer, songwriter, pianist
- Gary Burton, American jazz vibraphonist
- Gary Cherone, American rock singer-songwriter
- Gary Clark Jr., American musician
- Gary Crosby (born 1955), British jazz double bassist, composer and educator.
- Gary Garcia, American musician, songwriter
- Gary Graffman (1928–2025), American classical pianist
- Gary Green, an American conductor
- Gary Green (born 1950), English multi-instrumentalist of Gentle Giant, Three Friends
- Gary M. Green, an American musician and entrepreneur
- Gary Holt, Thrash metal guitarist, Exodus, Slayer
- Gary Kemp, British musician
- Garry Koehler, Australian songwriter
- Gary Lightbody, Northern Irish musician, songwriter
- Gary Lux, Austrian singer (Eurovision 1985 and 1987)
- Gary Moore (1952–2011), Northern Irish singer-songwriter and musician
- Gary Morris country singer
- Gary Numan, English singer, composer, musician
- Gary Puckett, American singer, front man for the 1960s group, The Union Gap
- Gary Richrath (1949–2015), American rock guitarist, member of REO Speedwagon
- Gary Rossington, Guitarist with Lynyrd Skynyrd
- Gary Stewart (1944–2003), American country rock singer-songwriter and musician
- Gary Thain, New Zealand rock bassist
- Gary Valenciano, Filipino actor, singer-songwriter, and television host
- Gary Weinrib, Canadian musician, singer-songwriter, lead vocalist, bassist, and keyboardist for the Canadian rock group Rush

=== Politics ===
- Gary Bikman (born 1943), Canadian politician
- Gary Casinghino, American politician
- Gary Condit, California congressman who was briefly a murder suspect
- Gary Coulombe, American politician
- Gary Drinkwater, American politician
- Gary Doer, Canadian diplomat and politician
- Gary Elkins, American politician from Texas
- Gary Hart, American politician, lawyer, author, professor, commentator
- Gary Johnson, American businessman and politician
- Gary Locke, American politician
- Garry McCarthy, former superintendent of the Chicago Police Department
- Garry Purewal, Canadian politician from British Columbia
- Gary Stidham, American politician
- Garry Thind, Canadian politician from British Columbia

=== Sports ===
- Gary Ablett, English footballer and manager
- Gary Ablett Jr., Australian rules footballer
- Gary Ablett Sr., Australian rules footballer
- Garry Ahern (1949–2025), New Zealand sports broadcaster
- Gary Alexander, American baseball player
- Gary Alexander (born 1969), American basketball player
- Gary Alexander, English footballer
- Gary Alexander, American martial artist
- Gary Alexander, American Olympic wrestler
- Gary Anderson, Scottish darts player
- Gary Anderson, American football player
- Gary Anderson, American football player
- Gary Anderson, American football player
- Gary Aramist, Israeli Olympic sport shooter
- Gary Bailey, English footballer
- Gary Baldinger, American football player
- Gary Balough, former NASCAR Cup Series driver
- Gary Barbaro, American football player
- Gary Barnidge, American football player
- Gary Bettman, American sports commissioner
- Gary Birtles, English football player
- Gary Brabham, Australian racing driver and convicted rapist
- Gary Brackett, American football player
- Gary Breen, Irish footballer
- Gary Brightwell (born 1999), American football player
- Gary Brown, American football player
- Gary Bryant Jr. (born 2001), American football player
- Gary Burley, American football player
- Gary Cahill, English footballer
- Gary Campbell, American football player
- Gary Carter, American baseball player
- Gary Clark, American football player
- Gary Cohen, American baseball commentator
- Garry Cobb, American football player
- Gary Collins, American football player
- Gary Cunningham (born 1940 or 1941), American basketball coach and athletic director
- Gary Cuozzo, American football player
- Gary Danielson, American football player
- Gary David, Filipino basketball player
- Gary Dulin, American-born Canadian football player
- Gary Dunn, American football player
- Gary Fencik, American football player
- Gary Garrison, American football player
- Gary Gillespie, Scottish football player
- Garry Gilliam, American football player
- Gary Goodridge (born 1966), Trinidadian-Canadian former heavyweight kickboxer and mixed martial artist
- Gary Greaves, American football player
- Gary Green, American football player
- Gary Green, American baseball player
- Gary Green, American businessman and minor-league baseball team owner
- Gary Green, Canadian ice hockey player
- Gary Gussman, American football player
- Gary Hart (footballer) (born 1976), British footballer
- Gary Hart (wrestler) (1942–2008), American professional wrestler and wrestling manager
- Gary Hocking, Rhodesian motorcycle racer
- Gary Hogeboom, American football player
- Gary Holt, a Scottish footballer
- Gary Holt, a Canadian ice hockey player
- Gary Hooper (Paralympian) (1939–2025), Australian Paralympic competitor
- Gary Huff, American football player
- Gary Hughes, HGV Driver and FA Coach
- Gary Jennings Jr. (born 1997), American football player
- Gary Jeter, American football player
- Gary "Big Hands" Johnson, American football player
- Gary Johnson (racing driver) (born 1940), American racing driver
- Garry Kallos (born 1956), Canadian wrestler and sambo competitor
- Garry Kasparov, Russian chess grand master and former world champion
- Gary Kelly, Northern Irish international indoor and lawn bowler
- Gary Kelly, British football goalkeeper
- Gary Kelly, Irish footballer who played for Leeds United
- Gary Knafelc, American football player
- Gary Kubiak, American football player and coach
- Gary Lane, American football player and referee
- Gary Larsen, American football player
- Gary Lewis, American football player
- Gary Lewis, American football player
- Gary Lewis, American football player
- Gary Lineker, English footballer
- Garry Lyon, Australian rules footballer
- Gary Maloncon, American basketball player
- Gary Marangi, American football player
- Gary McSheffrey, English footballer
- Gary Medel, Chilean football player
- Gary Moeller, American football coach
- Gary Naysmith, Scottish footballer
- Gary Neville, English footballer
- Gary O'Neil (born 1983), English former professional footballer
- Garry O'Neill (born 1974), Australian martial artist
- Gary O'Neill (born 1982), Irish footballer who played for Shelbourne in the 2000s
- Gary O'Neill (born 1995) Irish footballer who, as of 2022, plays for Shamrock Rovers
- Gary Paffett, English racing driver
- Gary Parris, American football player
- Gary Payton, American basketball player
- Gary Phaeton, French basketball player
- Gary Player, South African golfer
- Gary Plummer, American football player
- Gary Reynolds (1966–2020), American professional football coach
- Garry Ringrose, Irish rugby union player
- Gary Robinson, Canadian football player
- Gary Sheffield, American baseball player
- Gary Spani, American football player
- Gary Speed, Welsh footballer and manager
- Gary Stevens, English footballer
- Gary Stills, American football player
- Gary Trent Jr., American basketball player
- Gary Walker, American football player
- Gary Walker, American football player
- Gary Wisener, American football player
- Gary Zimmerman, American football player

=== Crime ===
- Gary Evans (1954–1998), American thief and confessed serial killer
- Gary Gilmore (1940–1977), American executed criminal
- Gary Glitter, English glam rock singer and convicted child molester
- Gary M. Heidnik (1943–1999), American rapist and killer
- Gary Hilton (born 1946), American serial killer
- Gary Steven Krist, American fugitive
- Gary Plauché (1945–2014), American man known for the 1984 killing of Jeff Doucet
- Gary Ridgway, American fugitive
- Gary Stamp (died 2014), American man known for the killing of Long Beach Jane Doe

== Fictional characters ==
- Gary, a character played Jason Priestley in the 1986 American fantasy drama film The Boy Who Could Fly
- Gary, a character from the adult anthology series Love, Death & Robots
- Gary Chalmers, a superintendent from the animated sitcom series The Simpsons
- Gary Davis/Gary David, a character in Philippine drama series Mara Clara (1992 TV series) and Mara Clara (2010 TV series)
- Gary De'Snake, a character in Zootopia 2
- Gary Finkel, supporting character in the video game Dead Rising 3
- Gary Goodspeed, the main character from the animated space opera comedy series Final Space
- Gary Granger, character in the 1993 film Addams Family Values
- Gary Grooberson, character in the 2021 film Ghostbusters: Afterlife
- Gary Gulliver, the protagonist of Hanna-Barbera's 1968 animated TV series The Adventures Of Gulliver
- Gary Harrison, from the South Park episode All About Mormons
- Gary Oak, a researcher and gym leader from the Pokémon video game series
- Gary Prince, the gender-swapped and real version of Princess Bubblegum in Adventure Time: Fionna and Cake
- Gary "Roach" Sanderson, the main protagonist from the video game Call of Duty: Modern Warfare 2
- Gary Smith, from the video game Bully
- Gary "Eggsy" Unwin, the main protagonist of the Kingsman comic book and film series
- Gary Walsh, a character in the American political sitcom Veep
- Gary Windass, a character from the British TV soap opera Coronation Street
- Gary the Gadget Guy, a character from the MMO video game Club Penguin
- Gary the Snail, SpongeBob's pet snail from the animated series SpongeBob SquarePants
- Sleepy Gary, an alien parasite from the animated series Rick and Morty

== See also ==
- Nathan Lyon (born 1987), Australian cricketer, nicknamed Garry
- Romain Gary (1914–1980), French writer
- Gareth (given name)
- Gregory (given name)
