= List of people from the Royal Borough of Greenwich =

List of people from Greenwich :

- Astronomer Royal Sir George Airy (1801–1892), lived at the White House, Crooms Hill
- Boy George, lead singer of Culture Club, born in Eltham, Greenwich
- Canon Richard Rhodes Bristow, born in Greenwich
- Writer Jocelyn Brooke, lived at 13 Eliot Place, Blackheath.
- Philip Dormer Stanhope, 4th Earl of Chesterfield, statesman and man of letters, lived at the Ranger's House, Chesterfield Walk, Greenwich.
- Composer and conductor Christopher D. Cook, born and raised in Charlton
- Actor Dominic Cooper, born in Greenwich
- Jim Davidson, comedian and actor was born in Kidbrooke
- Actor and comedian Simon Day, born in Blackheath
- Poet Cecil Day-Lewis (1904–1972), lived at 6 Crooms Hill
- Actor Sir Daniel Day-Lewis, who has won three Academy Awards, two Golden Globes, four BAFTAs and three Screen Actors Guild Awards, grew up in Charlton, Greenwich
- Engineer Alexander Duckham (1877–1945), founder of the Duckhams oil company, was born in Blackheath, living in Dartmouth Grove and in Vanbrugh Castle, east Greenwich. His brother Arthur Duckham, founder of the Institution of Chemical Engineers, was also born and raised in Blackheath.
- Syd Ellis (1931–2001), footballer (full back)
- Novelist and professor of English Bernardine Evaristo was born in Eltham and attended Eltham Hill Grammar School for Girls
- Journalist and radio presenter Nick Ferrari has lived in Blackheath since 1985
- Actress, singer, Lotti Fraser, 1989–
- David Frost, Baron Frost, diplomat, civil servant and politician
- Christopher Gabbitas, baritone with The King's Singers A cappella group, currently lives in Greenwich
- Evening Standard journalist Andrew Gilligan, currently lives in Greenwich
- James Glaisher FRS (1809–1903), pioneer meteorologist and balloon aeronaut, lived for 34 years at 20 Dartmouth Hill, Blackheath
- Robin Hanson (1908–1991), pre-World War 2 racing driver and Royal Air Force pilot awarded the DFC
- Malcolm Hardee (1950–2005), comedian, author, club proprietor, agent, manager and former "Father of British alternative comedy" spent most of his life in Greenwich and ran his two most famous clubs there – The Tunnel (near Blackwall Tunnel) and Up The Creek, which still exists in Creek Road
- Blake Harrison, actor most famous for his role as "Neil" in The Inbetweeners born in Greenwich
- Musician Jools Holland, lives in Greenwich and at Cooling Castle, Kent
- Jazz and blues guitarist Billy Jenkins ran Wood Wharf rehearsal studios, situated to the west of the Cutty Sark, during the 1980s
- Glen Johnson, footballer who plays for England and Stoke City, was born in Greenwich, 23 August 1984
- Dr Samuel Johnson (1709–1784), essayist, critic, poet, and lexicographer, lived in Greenwich Church Street when he first came to London in 1736.
- Henry Kelsey (c. 1667–1724), early explorer of Canada, was born and married in East Greenwich, and buried in St Alfege's Church.
- Kwasi Kwarteng, politician
- Guitarist Albert Lee, grew up in Blackheath, Greenwich
- Comedian Dan Leno, rented accommodation at the Spreadeagle Tavern, Stockwell Street in 1902.
- Cricketer Charles Lewin, and Royal Navy rear admiral
- Professional footballer Barry Little (1964–1994), born in Greenwich.
- Interior designer and television presenter Laurence Llewelyn-Bowen, lived in Greenwich
- Indie band Lucky Soul, based in Greenwich
- Comic postcard artist Donald McGill (1875–1962) lived at 5 Bennett Park, Blackheath Village
- Drummer Mitch Mitchell of The Jimi Hendrix Experience, born in Greenwich in 1946
- Dr James Monro of Bethlem Hospital-fame, began his medical practice here in 1713
- Gary Moore, footballer
- Novelist Mary Anna Needell (née Lupton), was born at Vanbrugh Castle in 1830.
- Mechanical engineer John Penn was born in Greenwich and his main works were situated in south Greenwich, close to the modern-day junction of Blackheath Road and Lewisham Road
- Actor Keith Pyott, born in Blackheath
- Actress Vanessa Redgrave, born in Greenwich
- Eric Gascoigne Robinson VC, naval commander and war hero, born in Greenwich
- Wing Commander Jack Rose (1917–2009), RAF fighter pilot and colonial administrator, was born in Blackheath and attended Shooters Hill School.
- Businessman Frank Searle, born in Greenwich in 1874
- Victor Serebriakoff, International President of Mensa, lived at Blackheath
- Francis Shand (1855–1921), cricketer
- Actor Ben Small, lives in Greenwich
- Artist Richard Spare, established his Wellington Studio in Charlton, Greenwich in the late 1980s
- Renaissance composer, musician, and Gentleman of the Chapel Royal, Thomas Tallis, died in Greenwich on 23 November 1585
- Architect Samuel Sanders Teulon (1812–1873), born in Greenwich
- Artist Sir James Thornhill, said to have lived in Park Hall on Crooms Hill (originally designed for architect John James who never actually occupied the house)
- Liz Truss, politician
- Cricketer and British Army officer Arthur Tyler, born at Charlton in 1907
- King Henry VIII (Tudor), was born in Greenwich on 28 June 1491.
- Architect Sir John Vanbrugh (1664–1726), lived at 121 Maze Hill in a house of his own design, today known as Vanbrugh Castle, overlooking Greenwich Park
- Filmmaker John Walsh, born and still resides in Greenwich
- Barrister Mark Watson-Gandy, currently lives in the Blackheath district of the Royal Borough of Greenwich
- Benjamin Waugh (1839–1908), founder of the UK charity the National Society for the Prevention of Cruelty to Children, lived in Crooms Hill
- Actor Colin Wells, born in Greenwich
- Actor Ben Willbond lives in Greenwich
- General James Wolfe (1727– 1759), lived in Macartney House on Crooms Hill, and was buried in St Alfege's Church.
- Sir Alfred Yarrow (1842–1932), shipbuilder, lived in Woodlands, Mycenae Road, north of Blackheath
- Sir Charles Kuen Kao (1933 – 2018), an electrical engineer, lived on Wrottesley Road in Plumstead, Greenwich.
