= Gary Johnson (disambiguation) =

Gary Johnson (born 1953) is the former governor of New Mexico and candidate for U.S. president in 2012 and 2016.

Gary or Garry Johnson may also refer to:

== Politics ==
- Gary Johnson (Wisconsin politician) (1939–2008), American politician, Wisconsin State Assembly
- W. Gary Johnson, Libertarian candidate in the New York gubernatorial election, 1990
- Gary C. Johnson (born 1946), member of the Kentucky Senate

== Sports ==
- Gary "Big Hands" Johnson (1952–2010), American football player
- Gary Johnson Jr. (born 1996), American football linebacker
- Gary Johnson (footballer, born 1955), English football player and manager
- Gary Johnson (footballer, born 1959), English football player
- Gary Johnson (rugby union) (born 1984), London Irish rugby union player
- Gary Johnson (baseball manager) (1938–2012), baseball manager and scout who also played in the minor leagues
- Gary Johnson (outfielder) (born 1975), Major League Baseball player
- Gary Johnson (racing driver) (born 1940), American racing driver

== Other ==
- Garry Johnson (1937–2026), British military general
- Gary R. Johnson (born 1949), American academic
- Gary L. Johnson, American scientist
- Gary Johnson (1947–2022), American college professor and inspiration for the fictional 2023 film Hit Man
- Jellybean Johnson (1956–2025), American musician born Garry Johnson

== See also ==
- Gary Johnston (born 1941), Australian rules footballer
- Gary W. Johnston (1964–2022), United States Army general
