= Amelia Oilfield =

Oilfield in Texas, US

- Location within Texas
- Country: United States
- Region: East Texas Oil Field
- Offshore/onshore: Onshore
- Coordinates: 30.0775°N 94.234444°W
- Owner: Amelia Company

Field history
- Discovery: 1936
- Start of production: February 12, 1936
- Peak of production: 2,644,642 barrels
- Peak year: 1939

The Amelia Oilfield is a petroleum reservoir located near the community of Amelia, within Jefferson County, Texas, United States. It is situated approximately five miles west of Beaumont.

== History ==
The area of Amelia Oilfield was overshadowed by nearby Spindletop, and took scientific advancement for the presence of oil to be discovered. In May 1925, the area was recommended to Humble Oil by Humble Oil geologists Ben Palmo and W. D. Blackburn, because of the presence of shallow sulfur water. With the use of seismometers, oil was discovered. In October 1935, Humble Oil blocked off thousands of acres—including the 1,220-acre reservoir—and built a wildcat drill. Three drillings returned saltwater and no oil, and on the fourth in 1936, oil was discovered. The oil sand discovered was nicknamed "Langham sand" to differentiate it from other nonproductive sands of the Frio Deep-Seated Salt Dome Fields.

Upon hearing about the oil discovery, Glenn McCarthy drilled 12,000 feet north of the discovery well, failing to strike oil. Though oil did exist where he drilled, the Anahuac Formation—a different formation from Humble's area—was later discovered by drilling from Texaco and Normandie Oil Corporation. The areas were one oilfield—unofficially called "West Beaumont"—before being divided by the Railroad Commission of Texas in December 1936. The area around McCarthy's drill continued being called West Beaumont, while the area around Humble's drill was renamed to Amelia. In 1948, Sunoco established a geophysical lab there.

Amelia Oilfield is currently owned by the Amelia Company. In 2013, its fabrication yard was announced to be closing and its operations moved to Altamira Municipality, Tamaulipas. In 2015, the company diversified its services to remain profitable.

== Topography ==
Amelia Oilfield's area is a prairie with fertile soil, once considered good for farming rice. An overall flat area, it slopes southeast at 2 to 3 feet per mile. Most of the settlers in the area cultivated rice and figs until c. 1924, when a freeze killed yields.

== Geology ==
Situated under the Frio Formation of the Frio Deep-Seated Salt Dome Fields, Amelia Oilfield's oil dates to the Oligocene and is accumulated on the downthrown side, as opposed to the upthrown side. The oil is deep underground, with oil being found 6,694 to 6,785 below the surface.

Besides one small fault, the area is free from fault lines.

== Oil production ==
Amelia Oilfield began production on February 12, 1936, and had 15 active wells by the end of the year. By 1939, 114 wells were drilled. At its peak in 1939, the field yielded 2,644,642 barrels.
