= Garry Peters =

Garry Peters may refer to:

- Garry Peters (ice hockey) (born 1942), Canadian ice hockey player and coach
- Garry Peters (gridiron football) (born 1991), American gridiron football defensive back
- Garry Peters (footballer) (born 1945), Australian rules footballer

== See also ==
- Gary Peters (disambiguation)
