= Gerald Anderson (disambiguation) =

Gerald Anderson (born 1989) is a Filipino American actor based in the Philippines.

Gerald Anderson may also refer to:

- Gerald K. Anderson (1921–1995), Wisconsin legislator
- Gerald Frank Anderson (1898–1984), South African born flying ace
- Gerald Anderson (cyclist), British cyclist
- Gerald Hamilton Anderson (1922–2003), Canadian politician

== See also ==
- Gerry Anderson (disambiguation)
- Jerry Anderson (disambiguation)
- Gerard Anderson (1889–1914), British hurdler
