= Jeremiah Anderson =

Jeremiah Anderson may refer to:

- Jeremiah Anderson (curling) in 2009 Molson Scotia Cup
- Jeremiah Anderson (abolitionist) (1833–1859)
- Jeremiah Anderson (politician) in 48th New York State Legislature

== See also ==
- Jerry Anderson (disambiguation)
