= Gary Moore (disambiguation) =

Gary Moore was a musician from Belfast, Northern Ireland, best recognized as a blues rock guitarist and singer.

Gareth, Gar, Garry or Gary Moore may also refer to:

== Performers ==
- Garry Moore (1915–1993), American radio and TV personality
- Gar Moore (1920–1985), American film and TV actor (1947's To Live in Peace)
- Gary "Moses Mo" Moore, American guitarist for the band Mother's Finest

== Politicians ==
- Garry Moore (South Dakota politician) (born 1949), American Democratic state legislator
- Garry Moore (mayor) (born 1951), New Zealand mayor of Christchurch

== Sportspeople ==
- Gary Moore (baseball) (born 1945), American outfielder
- Gary Moore (footballer, born 1945) (1945–2021), English footballer who played for Southend United
- Gary Moore (footballer, born 1968), English footballer who played for Maidstone United
- Gary Moore (racing driver), American stock car racing driver
- Gareth Moore (born 1989), English rugby league footballer

== Writers ==
- Gareth Moore (theologian) (1948–2002), English author and Dominican friar
- Gary W. Moore (born 1954), American author of Playing with the Enemy

== See also ==
- Gary Moore (album), Gary Moore's 1982 compilation album
- Gerry Moore (1903–1993), English jazz pianist
- Jerry Moore (disambiguation)
