= Jerry Anderson (politician) =

American politician (born 1935)

Member of the Utah House of Representatives from the 69th district
- Incumbent
- Assumed office January 1, 2013
- Preceded by: Christine Watkins

Personal details
- Born: August 19, 1935 (age 90) Salt Lake City, Utah, U.S.
- Party: Republican
- Education: University of Utah (BS); Brigham Young University (MS)
- Profession: Beekeeper
- Website: Campaign site

Jerry B. Anderson (born August 19, 1935) is an American politician and a Republican member of the Utah House of Representatives representing District 69 since January 1, 2013.

== Early life and career ==
Anderson was born August 19, 1935, in Salt Lake City where he grew up and earned an Eagle Scout Award. He earned his BS in biology from the University of Utah and his MS in biology from Brigham Young University. He was a coal miner and then worked as an educator and taught science and math until he retired and is currently self-employed as a beekeeper. He currently lives in Salt Lake City with his wife Shirley. They are the parents of 15 children. He is a member of The Church of Jesus Christ of Latter-Day Saints.

== Political career ==
2012 To challenge District 69 incumbent Democratic Representative Christine Watkins, Anderson was unopposed for the June 26, 2012 Republican Primary, and won the November 6, 2012 General election with 6,476 votes (51.3%) against Representative Watkins.

2008 When District 69 incumbent Democratic Representative Brad King ran for Utah State Senate, Anderson was unopposed for the June 24, 2008 Republican Primary but lost the November 4, 2008 General election to Democratic nominee Christine Watkins.

During the 2013-2014 Legislative General Session Anderegg was on the House Political Subdivisions Committee and the House Public Utilities and Technology Committee.

== 2014 Sponsored Legislation ==
Bill number	Bill title	Status
HB0052	Government Continuity Legislative Task Force	House/ filed - 3/13/2014
HB0058	Bigamy Revisions	House/ filed - 3/13/2014
HB0229	Air Contaminant Definition Change	House/ filed - 3/13/2014

== Pivotal Bills ==
Anderson proposed HB0229 Air Contaminant Definition Change during the 2014 General Session and proposed raising the acceptable limit for gases that were naturally found in the environment. He made claims that the atmosphere needed more carbon dioxide and received notable media attention for his comments. The bill was returned to the House Rules Committee upon its second reading and died there.
