= Maxine Mesinger =

Former celebrity gossip columnist

- Born: Maxine Ethel David; December 19, 1925
- Died: January 19, 2001 (aged 75)
- Occupation: columnist

Maxine Mesinger, born Maxine Ethel David (December 19, 1925 - January 19, 2001) was a celebrity gossip columnist of the Houston Chronicle who was active between 1965 and 2000. Her works were published in the "Big City Beat," her social column. She had the nickname "Miss Moonlight". Clifford Pugh of the Houston Chronicle said that she "wrote about big names for half of the 20th century and became a celebrity in her own right". Lisa Gray of the Houston Press said that Mesinger "wrote in the swingin' lingo of '40s showbiz".

== Life ==
She was born in 1925 to Julian "Drake" David and Ella David. She graduated from San Jacinto High School, and went on to study at Texas Woman's University, Indiana University Bloomington, and the University of Houston. In 1944 she married Emil Mesinger, with whom she had two children, Julianne and Jay. Mesinger had a career in television, including two celebrity-oriented shows which she hosted in the 1950s, on a television station operated by the University of Houston. In 1964 the Houston Chronicle hired her as a columnist. For a period she and her family lived at the Shamrock Hotel.

== Death and legacy ==
Mesinger was afflicted by multiple sclerosis. On Friday January 19, 2001, at The Methodist Hospital, Mesinger died from complications of multiple sclerosis, at the age 75. On September 9, 2003, the Maxine Mesinger Multiple Sclerosis Clinic at Baylor College of Medicine and The Methodist Hospital opened. Her husband Emil continued living in their house near River Oaks.

Mesinger had amassed a collection of antiques, fine art, mementos, and photographs of Hollywood actors and actresses from the second half of the 20th century. This collection was called the "Maxine Mesinger Memorial Museum" by her family. Emil and his children could not decide how to dispose of the collection before Emil's death in June 2013, after which the two children announced an auction of the collection to be held on October 26, 2013, at Morton Auctioneers and Appraisers. The auctioneer was Colette Clift Mayers, vice-president of the firm. The Mesinger Sclerosis Clinic was to receive a portion of the proceeds.
