= Gary Mitchell (disambiguation) =

Gary Mitchell is a Northern Irish dramatist.

Gary or Garry Mitchell may also refer to:

== People ==
- Gary Mitchell (television presenter), Australian presenter and producer on Sweet and Sour (2000s TV series)
- Gary Mitchell (strongman) in 1997 World's Strongest Man
- Garry Mitchell, see 2000–01 Motherwell F.C. season
- Gary Mitchell (curler) in 1991 Labatt Brier

== Fictional characters ==
- Gary Mitchell (Star Trek), a Star Trek (TOS) character
- Gary Mitchell, fictional character in My Dream Is Yours
