= Shamrock Hotel =

Former hotel in Texas, US

- Hotel chain: Hilton Hotels & Resorts

General information
- Status: Demolished
- Type: Hotel
- Location: Main St. & W. Holcombe Blvd., Houston, TX 77030, United States
- Opening: March 17, 1949
- Closed: June 1986; 40 years ago
- Demolished: June 1, 1987; 39 years ago
- Owner: Glenn McCarthy; Pat O'Brien

Technical details
- Floor count: 18

Design and construction
- Architect: Wyatt C. Hedrick

Other information
- Number of rooms: 1,100
- Number of restaurants: 3

The Shamrock was a hotel constructed between 1946 and 1949 by wildcatter Glenn McCarthy southwest of downtown Houston, Texas next to the Texas Medical Center. It was the largest hotel built in the United States during the 1940s. The grand opening of the Shamrock is still cited as one of the biggest social events ever held in Houston. Sold to Hilton Hotels in 1955 and operated for over three decades as the Shamrock Hilton, the facility endured financial struggles throughout its history. Hilton Hotels sold the hotel to the Texas Medical Center in 1985 and it was demolished in 1987. The former hotel site is now campus locations for Texas A&M Institute of Biosciences and Technology and DeBakey High School for the Health Professions.

== Design and construction ==
Designed by Fort Worth architect Wyatt C. Hedrick, the eighteen-story building with a green tile pitched roof and 1,100 rooms was conceived by McCarthy as a city-sized hotel scaled for conventions with a resort atmosphere. The hotel was located in a suburban area three miles (5 km) southwest of downtown Houston at the acute southwest corner of Main Street and Bellaire Boulevard (West Holcombe Boulevard after 1963). At the time, this was on the fringes of countryside and was meant to be the first phase of a much larger indoor shopping and entertainment complex called McCarthy Center, anchored alongside the planned Texas Medical Center. At the hotel's north side was a five-story building containing a 1,000-car garage and 25,000-square-foot (2,300 m^{2}) exhibition hall. To the south was the hotel's lavishly landscaped garden designed by Ralph Ellis Gunn, a terrace and an immense swimming pool, meeting Olympic specifications, measuring 165 (50m) by 142 feet (43 m) described as the world's biggest outdoor pool, which accommodated exhibition water skiing and featured a 3-story-high diving platform with an open spiral staircase.

Construction was completed for about $21,000,000 (equivalent to over $200,000,000 in 2007).

Politician and entrepreneur Jesse H. Jones privately warned McCarthy that business travelers would be reluctant to stay at a hotel three miles south from downtown Houston. Hotel industry executives flatly warned McCarthy the project would not be profitable. He publicly replied, "I went into the oil business in 1933 when everybody said I was a damn fool. Now they're saying it again about my hotel."

The 5,000-square-foot (460 m^{2}) lobby fabricated in highly figured Honduras mahogany sourced from a single log and with added trim heavily influenced by Art Deco, a design movement which had been popular during the 1920s and 30s, was manufactured by local Millworker, Brochsteins Inc., who also fabricated the millwork for the Shamrock Room, The Cork Club, and the Emerald Room. They also designed and fabricated the interiors of the Men's shop and the Smart Shop. McCarthy ordered furnishings and decor in 63 shades of green, a nod to his ancestral Ireland. Hedrick's architectural firm reportedly had been the third-largest in the U.S., however his conservative design for the building's exterior along with its lavish interiors by Robert D. Harrell of Los Angeles drew wide criticism, notably from Frank Lloyd Wright who while being shown the completed facility before it opened, pointed at the lobby ceiling and said to Fay Jones, "That, young man, is an example of the effects of venereal disease on architecture." Wright also called the Shamrock "an imitation Rockefeller Center" (which had been completed ten years earlier). McCarthy claimed the decor represented "the best of all periods." Time magazine described it as "eclectic." The building's structural design has since been characterized as "more robust and sturdy than sleek and futuristic."

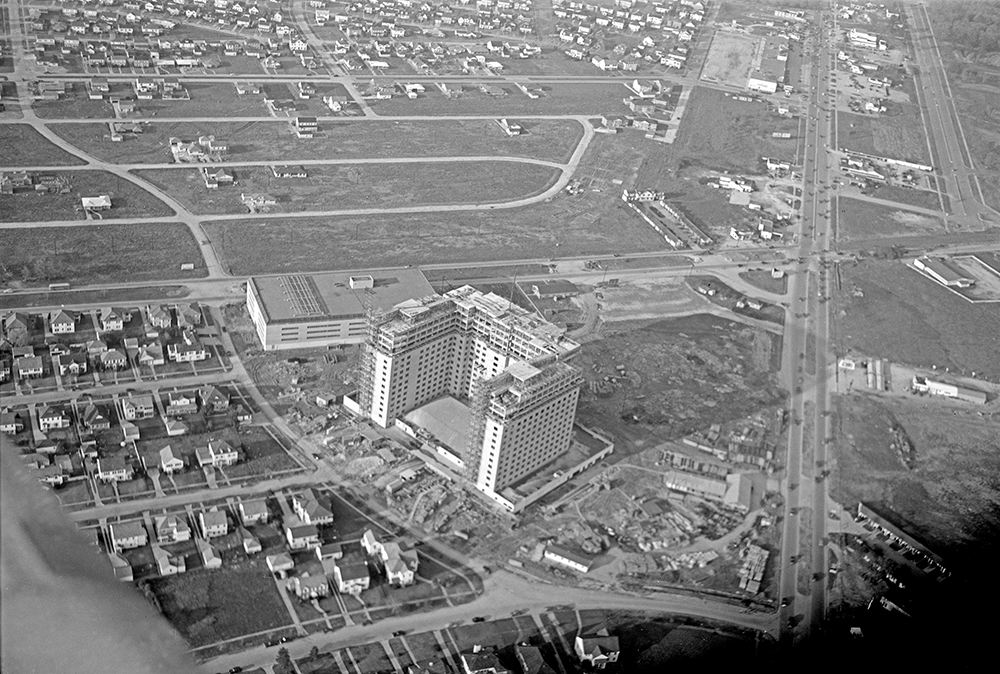
Construction site in 1947 captured by Robert Yarnall

== Historic grand opening ==
The hotel opened with fireworks displays on St. Patrick’s Day 1949. Two thousand Houstonians paid $42 a person to have dinner at what was widely publicized as “Houston’s biggest party" which cost an estimated one million dollars. The party was attended by over 150 Hollywood celebrities including Ginger Rogers, Hedda Hopper, Robert Preston and Errol Flynn along with noted Los Angeles business executives and reporters, some of whom were flown in to Houston International Airport on a customized Boeing 307 Stratoliner airplane which McCarthy had bought only days earlier from Howard Hughes. Many more were brought in by train on a chartered Santa Fe Super Chief. With a crowd estimated at 50,000 gathering outside the hotel, newspaper boys dressed in black tie handed out commemorative editions of the Houston Post as guests arrived that evening. The party became very overcrowded, with three thousand people milling in the hotel's public areas, a thousand more than had been foreseen. Houston mayor Oscar F. Holcombe and his wife sat in a hallway for two hours after his chair was stolen. "It was the worst mob scene I have ever witnessed," Holcombe said later. The festivities became so raucous that a radio broadcast from the hotel by actress, singer and World War II pinup girl Dorothy Lamour was cut off by the network; assuming he was off-air, NBC audio engineer Raoul Murphy uttered an expletive heard live nationwide and dead air greeted the audience for a very long twenty seconds.

The Houston Chronicle's society editor wrote that the event was "bedlam in diamonds". Life called it "...the most dazzling exhibition of evening dresses and big names ever seen in Texas. Everyone had to concede it was quite a party and quite a hotel." The grand opening of the Shamrock is still cited as one of the biggest social events in Houston’s history.

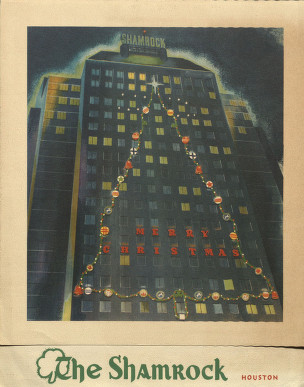
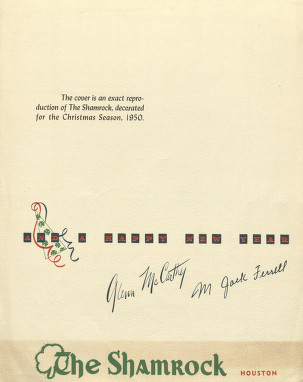
Christmas Card 1950 - The Shamrock Houston, Texas

== Operation ==
The Shamrock initially had a staff of 1,200 managed by George Lindholm, who had been recruited from the socially prominent Waldorf-Astoria hotel in New York. There were 23 different employee uniforms. Guests signed the register in "grass-hued" green ink and their luggage was carried by bellhops wearing emerald green, lemon trimmed uniforms past a portrait of McCarthy in the elevator lobby to air-conditioned, green-hued rooms each with generously framed abstract art on the walls, push-button radios (including recorded music from an elaborate in-house system through which an operator played extended-length phonographic records) and television, all somewhat rare amenities for a hotel at the time. Over a third of the rooms had kitchenettes. Celebrity singers (including Lamour) performed in the hotel's nightclub, called the Emerald Room. From 1949 to 1953 the Shamrock hosted a network radio program called Saturday at the Shamrock carried by the American Broadcasting Company, then the only nationally broadcast scripted radio program produced outside New York or Los Angeles.

However the Shamrock soon began experiencing persistent problems with occupancy rates and was seldom if ever full. McCarthy had spent lavishly, then borrowed heavily against his assets (including the hotel) to leverage a series of risky investments and his cash reserves quickly dwindled. Within a year Lindholm quietly resigned. In 1952 McCarthy defaulted on a loan and the hotel was acquired by Equitable Life Assurance Society. That same year author Edna Ferber described the Shamrock as the "Conquistador" in her novel Giant (and it was later briefly featured in the 1956 film adaptation directed by George Stevens). Despite financial troubles the resort-like Shamrock with its restaurants, bars and swank shops had become a popular gathering place for local society and was characterized as "Houston's Riviera" during the early 1950s. The Shamrock's private and sleek Cork Club was noted as the site of many oil deals (and reportedly, fist fights), along with performances by singer Frank Sinatra. In 1953 singer Patty Andrews of the Andrews Sisters launched her brief solo career in the hotel's still somewhat fashionable Emerald Room nightclub.

=== Shamrock Hilton ===
In 1954 the Hilton Hotels Corporation assumed management of the hotel and bought the property at a discount from its construction costs in 1955 but also struggled to find a profitable model for the huge facility, later shown to be isolated from both downtown Houston and its growing system of freeways. Moreover, the Shamrock was overwhelmed by competition from many much smaller, cheaper and automobile-friendly motels. A low two-story "lanai" wing in the form of a motel was added next to the swimming pool in 1957. Meanwhile, affluent suburban home buyers bypassed the area and the planned shopping and entertainment center was never built (although McCarthy's concept influenced the successful Houston Galleria which opened near an intersection of freeways on the city's west side in 1970). In about 1965 the first Trader Vic's restaurant in Texas was launched at the Shamrock where it did business until after 1985.

== Closure and demolition ==
Photographs Taken at One-Week Intervals During Demolition of the Shamrock Hotel, August - September, 1987.

By 1985, the 36-year-old hotel, which was still the second largest in Houston, was in need of extensive refurbishing and refitting. In March 1986, a protest rally was held by historic preservationists including McCarthy, and the hotel opened its last annual St. Patrick's Day party to the public. That evening, some people who had been at the opening night party in 1949 reportedly attended a semi-formal event in the hotel's Emerald Room. A few employees had been with the hotel since its first year of operation.

Following its closure in July 1986, the hotel was sold to the Texas Medical Center for $14.9 million, who at that point were undecided on whether to renovate or demolish the building. Artefacts and furnishings were sold off piece by piece and by August 1986, around 40% had been sold. The hotel was demolished on June 1, 1987.

== Redevelopment ==
The Albert B. Alkek Institute of Biosciences and Technology Building, a component of the Texas A&M Health Science Center, was constructed on the former north gardens of the hotel in 1992.

The $67 million DeBakey High School for Health Professions was constructed on the original site of the hotel structure in 2017.

Along with fountains and some landscaping on the northeast grounds, the hotel's multi-story parking garage has been retained, but the trademark green roof tiles have been removed. Shamrock Drive, the street in front of the hotel, was renamed to Pressler Street.

== Residents ==
- Maxine Mesinger and her family

== Programs/Menus ==
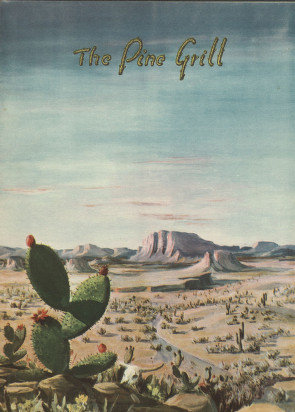
The Pine Grill Menu cover (circa April 1949)

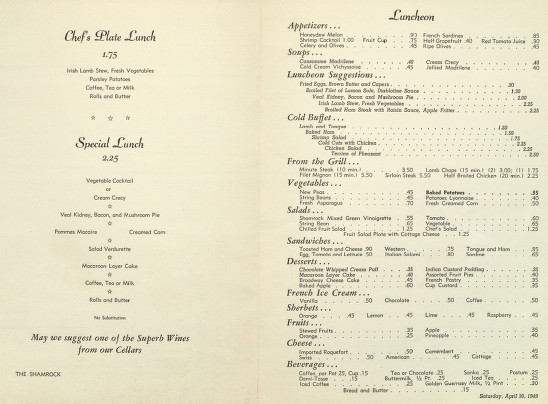
The Pine Grill Menu (inside, circa April 1949)

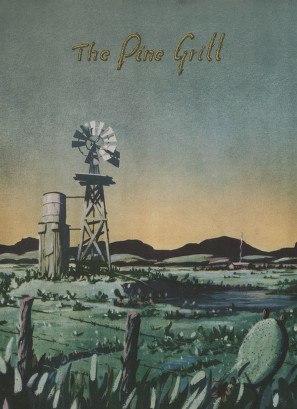
The Pine Grill Menu cover (circa July 1949)

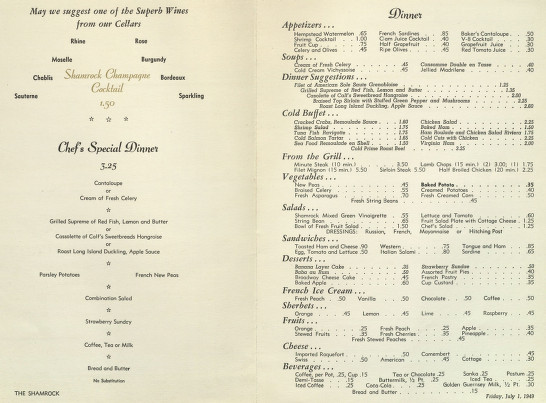
The Pine Grill Menu (inside, circa July 1949)

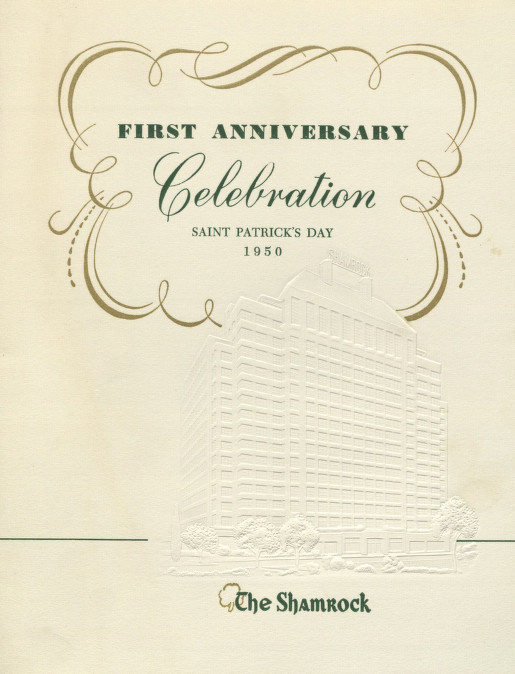
First Anniversary Saint Patrick's Day celebration (1950)

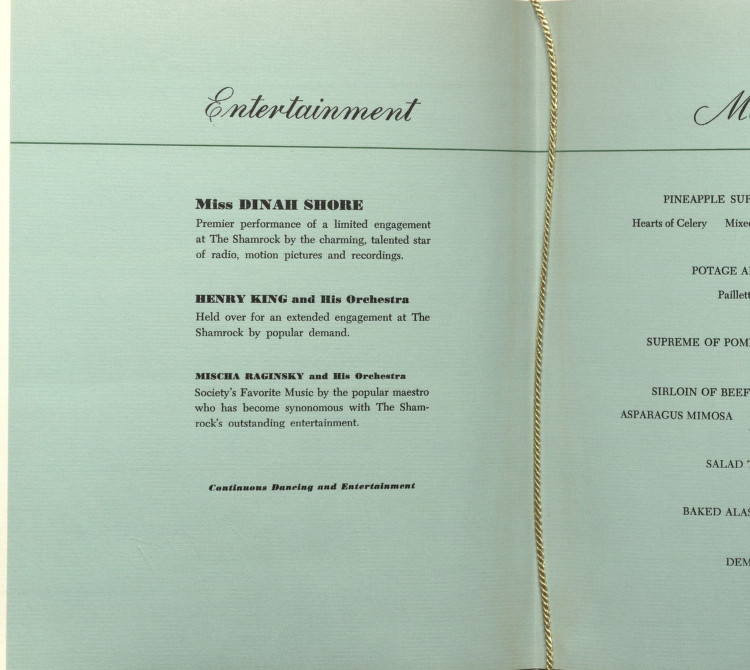
First Anniversary Saint Patrick's Day celebration - Entertainment featuring Dinah Shore (1950)

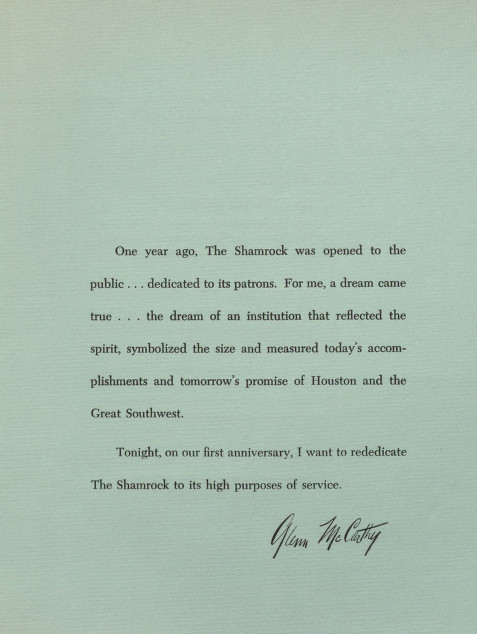
First Anniversary Saint Patrick's Day celebration - message from Glen McCarthy (1950)

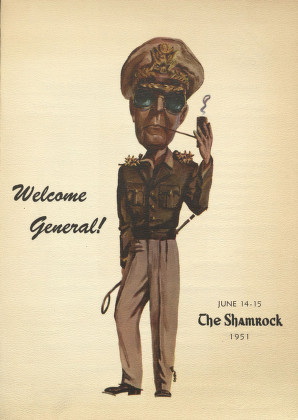
Shamrock Hotel, The Pine Grill menu cover featuring guest General Douglas MacArthur - 6-14-1951

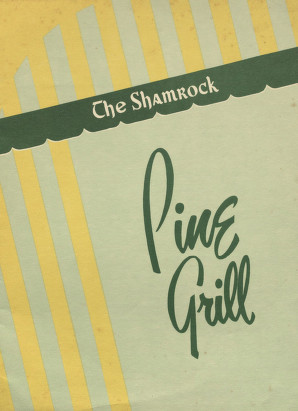
The Shamrock Hotel, The Pine Grill menu cover (circa 1949–1975)

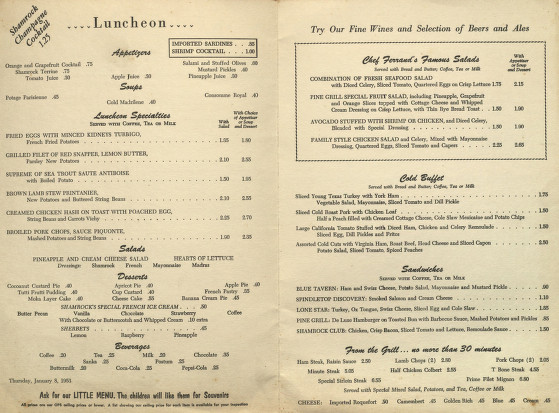
The Shamrock Hotel, The Pine Grill menu (inside, circa 1949–1975)

== See also ==
- History of Houston
- Architecture of Houston
