= JR Bird =

American politician

Member-elect of the Utah House of Representatives from the 67th district
- Assuming office January 2027
- Succeeding: Christine Watkins

Personal details
- Party: Republican

JR Bird is an American politician. A member of the Republican Party, he is the member-elect for the 67th district of the Utah House of Representatives.
