= Gary Schwartz (disambiguation) =

Gary Schwartz (born 1944) is an American psychologist and author.

Gary Schwartz may also refer to:

- Gary Schwartz (art historian) (born 1940)
- Gary Schwartz (designer), technology entrepreneur and investor
- Gary Schwartz (Manitoba politician)
- Gary Schwartz, voice actor known for voicing Heavy and Demoman in Team Fortress 2, among other roles
