= Jeremy Anderson =

Jeremy Anderson may refer to:

- Jeremy Anderson (artist) (1921–1982), American sculptor, professor in San Francisco
- Jeremy Anderson (golfer), 2000 PGA Tour Qualifying School graduates
- Jeremy Anderson (figure skater), 2005 United States Figure Skating Championships
- Jerime Anderson (born 1989), American basketball player

== See also ==
- Jerry Anderson (disambiguation)
