= Gerald Shapiro =

Gerald Shapiro may refer to:

- Gerald Shapiro (writer) (1950–2011), American writer
- Gerald Shapiro (composer) (born 1942), American composer

== See also ==
- Gary Shapiro (disambiguation)
