= Gary Shapiro =

Gary Shapiro could refer to:

- Gary J. Shapiro, American business executive
- Gary Shapiro (journalist), American newspaper writer

== See also ==
- Gerald Shapiro (disambiguation)
