= Gary Anderson =

Gary Anderson may refer to:

== Music ==
- Gary M. Anderson (born 1947), musician, conductor, arranger, music producer
- Gary Stephen Anderson or Angry Anderson (born 1947), Australian rock singer-songwriter and media personality
- Gary Levone Anderson or Gary U.S. Bonds (born 1939), American R&B and rock singer

== Sports ==
=== American football ===
- Gary Anderson (offensive lineman) (born 1955), American
- Gary Anderson (placekicker) (born 1959), South African placekicker
- Gary Anderson (running back) (born 1961), American

=== Other sports ===
- Gary Anderson (cyclist) (born 1967), New Zealand cyclist
- Gary Anderson (darts player) (born 1970), Scottish darts player
- Gary Anderson (motorsport) (born 1951), semi-retired F1 car designer
- Gary Anderson (swimmer) (born 1969), Canadian swimmer
- Gary Anderson (sport shooter) (born 1939), American competitive shooter and Olympic Gold Medal winner (2)

== Others ==
- Gary Anderson (designer) (born 1947), designer of the Universal Recycling Symbol

== See also ==
- Garry Don Anderson, known as Donny Anderson (born 1943), American former professional football player
- Gary Andersen (born 1964), American football coach
- Gary Andersson (born 1958), Swedish Olympic swimmer
- Gerry Anderson (disambiguation)
- Jerry Anderson (disambiguation)
