= Gary Cohen (disambiguation) =

Gary Cohen (born 1958) is an American sportscaster.

Gary Cohen may also refer to:

- Gary Cohen (footballer) (born 1984), English cyclist and former footballer
- Gary G. Cohen (born 1934), American theologian
- Gary Cohen (health advocate), American environmental activist and health advocate
- Gary B. Cohen (born 1948), American historian
- Noah Creshevsky (Gary Cohen, 1945–2020), American composer and electronic musician

== See also ==
- Gary Cohn (disambiguation)
