= Gary Ross (disambiguation) =

Gary Ross is an American film director, producer, and writer.

Gary Ross may also refer to:

- Gary Ross (baseball), American baseball player
- Gary Ross (ice hockey), American ice hockey player
- Gary N. Ross, American energy economist
