= Gary Patterson (disambiguation) =

Gary Patterson (born 1960) is an American football coach and former player.

Gary Patterson may also refer to:

- Gary Patterson (footballer) (born 1972), English footballer
- Gary Patterson (artist) (born 1941), American artist
- Gary Paterson (born 1949), American Christian leader
