= San Jacinto High School (Houston) =

Secondary school in Texas, United States

Coordinates: 29.737412°N 95.376577°W

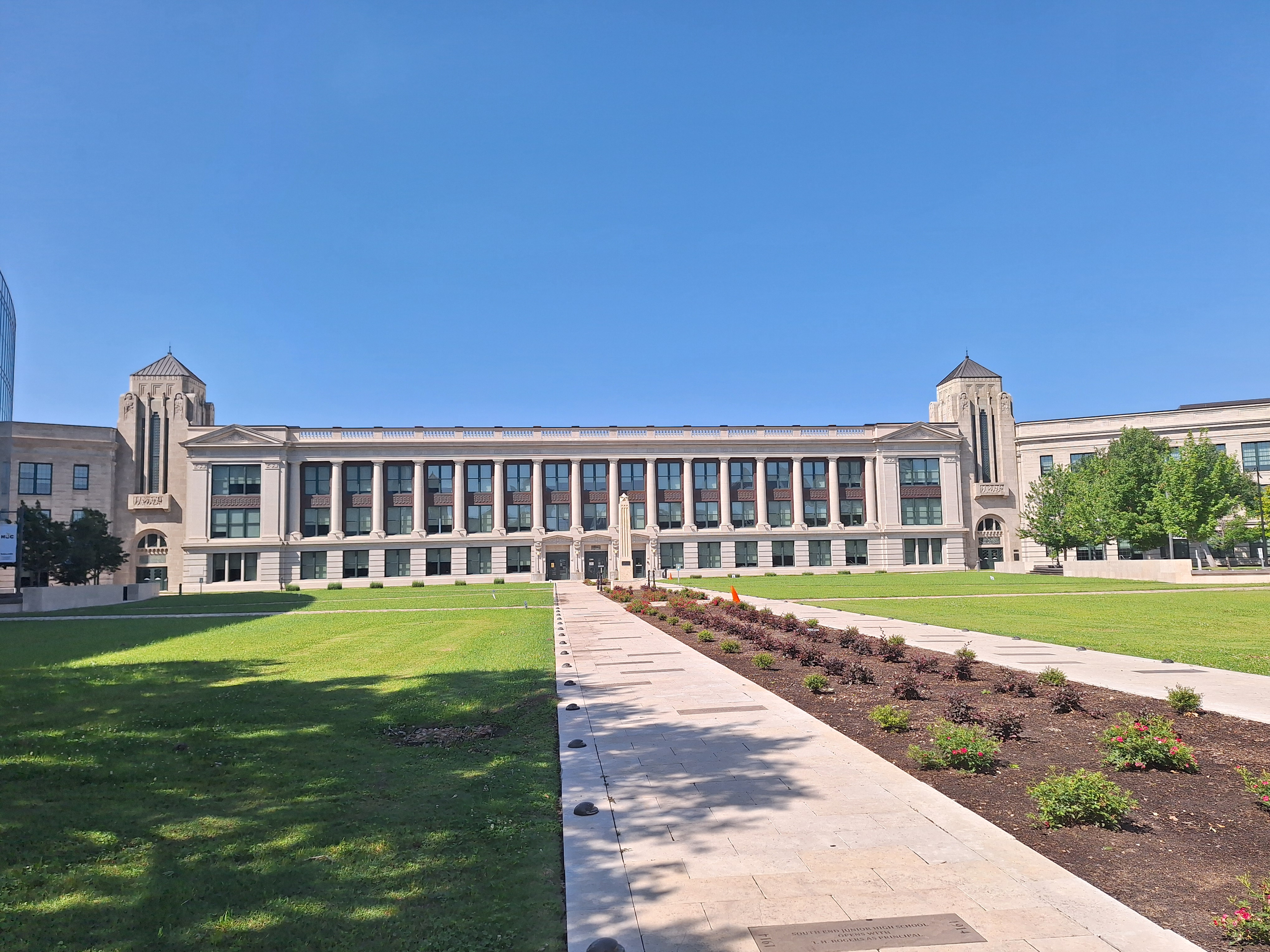
The San Jacinto Memorial Building in the Houston Community College Central Campus was formerly San Jacinto High School

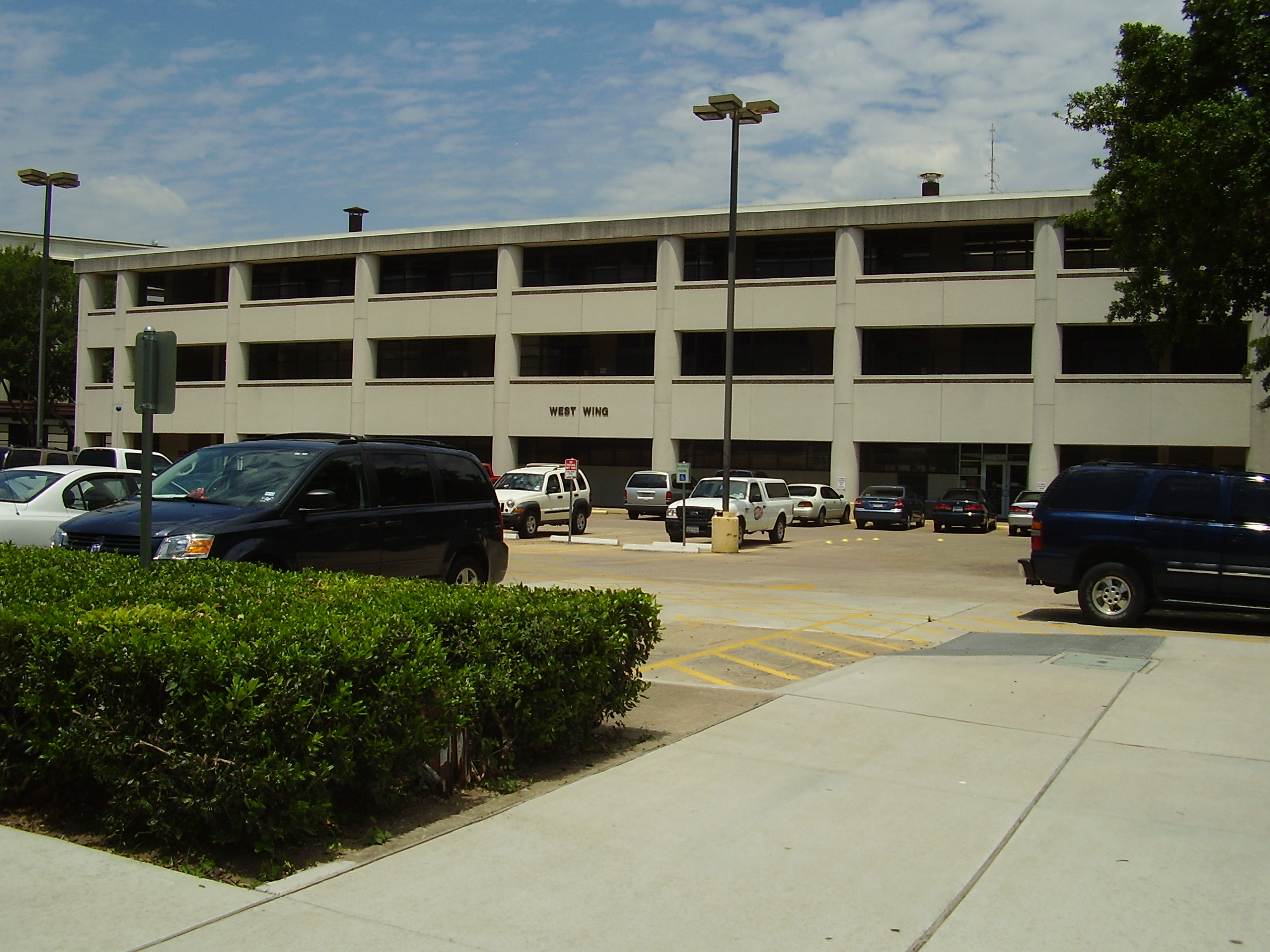
The West Wing in the Houston Community College Central Campus was formerly the vocational building

San Jacinto High School was a secondary school located at 1300 Holman Street in Houston, Texas; now part of the Houston Community College Central College, Central Campus. San Jacinto High School was located in the area now known as Midtown. It was a part of the Houston Independent School District (HISD). It was listed on the National Register of Historic Places (NRHP) on December 4, 2012.

== History ==
The campus, built in 1914, initially housed South End Junior High School; it closed in 1926 when the high school opened. It was established in 1926 after Central High School, which was located near Downtown Houston, was closed. From 1927 until 1934, the campus was also the first home to Houston Junior College, which eventually became the University of Houston.

Lamar High School opened in 1937, relieving San Jacinto.

In 1962, Houston Technical Institute (HTI) was added to the campus; HTI programs lasted until 1981. In 1966 HISD purchased a former Hebrew temple, Temple Beth Israel, that it began using as an annex for San Jacinto since its population was increasing. Elaine Clift Gore, the author of Talent Knows No Color: The History of an Arts Magnet High School, wrote that by fall 1969 San Jacinto's vocational program became "the premier HISD vocational high school".

The school was renamed the Houston Technical Institute on June 1, 1971. The neighborhood program ended in 1971, and the technical program was abolished in 1985. High School for the Performing and Visual Arts was housed at San Jacinto from 1971 to 1981. Houston Community College System purchased the school grounds.

In 2014, Skanska USA Building completed $35 million in work to update and restore the San Jacinto Memorial Building, which was originally built in phases between 1914 and 1936. Hidden, original windows were encountered during the demolition and restored/left in place as a design element. Other new elements were introduced including six 5,000-pound beams that have been installed to enable modern, column-free bathrooms, and an elevator tower, and four stair towers added to the rear of the building. In the auditorium, seating, plaster, and flooring were redone as well. The school received a Landmark Award for the renovation.

== Demographics ==
In 1969, 51.6% of San Jacinto's students were black and 48.4% were White. The figure for White students included non-Hispanic white students and Hispanics together. For several years prior to the 1970 desegregation, HISD had a policy stating that students wanting to take a vocational program could transfer to another school that offered that program whether it was a "white" school or a "black" school if the program was not offered at their zoned school.

In 1937 there were five students of Mexican origin enrolled at San Jacinto.

== Notable alumni ==
- Albert Bel Fay (1930), Houston businessman and Republican party activist
- Marva Black Beck, Texas politician
- Young Bussey, quarterback for the Chicago Bears of the NFL - killed in action during World War II
- Dr. Denton Cooley, heart surgeon
- Walter Cronkite (1933), television journalist
- A. J. Foyt, Jr., auto racer (also attended Pershing and Hamilton middle schools and Lamar High School - did not graduate from San Jacinto)
- Jimmy Kessler, founder of the Texas Jewish Historical Society
- James E. Lyon, Houston developer and Republican politician
- Glenn McCarthy, oilman and entrepreneur
- Maxine Mesinger, gossip columnist
- Jerry J. Moore, real estate developer
- Diane Ravitch, former US Assistant Secretary of Education, author, historian
- Gale Storm (born Josephine Cottle), actress and singer
- David Westheimer, author
- Kathy Whitmire, former Mayor of Houston
- Marvin Zindler, journalist and broadcaster for ABC-13 Houston
