= Jerome Anderson =

Jerome Anderson may refer to:

- Jerome Anderson (basketball) (1953–2009), American professional basketball player and coach
- Jerome Anderson (football agent), founder of Sports, Entertainment and Media Group (SEM)

== See also ==
- Jerry Anderson (disambiguation)
