= Amelia, Texas =

Unincorporated community in Texas, US

Amelia
- Annexed community
- Location in Texas
- Coordinates: 30.0699357°N 94.1910161°W
- Country: United States
- State: Texas
- County: Jefferson
- Elevation: 30 ft (9 m)

Amelia is an annexed community in Jefferson County, Texas, United States. It was unincorporated until being consolidated with Beaumont in 1957.

== History ==
Situated on U.S. Route 90 and Farm to Market Road 364. Established as a stop on the Texas and New Orleans Railroad, its first building was its post office; it was established in 1885. In 1903, the Beaumont, Sour Lake and Western Railway was built through the community, and a depot called Elizabeth—in honor of a resident—was built. Since 1911, Texas A&M University has operated an agricultural extension station. In 1949, Amelia's schools were consolidated by Beaumont Independent School District. The residents voted to incorporate the community in August 1955, but later voted to stop the incorporation. The community was annexed by Beaumont in 1957.

Amelia is home to the Amelia Oilfield.
