= Impulse Economy =

2011 book by Gary Schwartz

The Impulse Economy: Understanding Mobile Shoppers and What Makes Them Buy
- Author: Gary Schwartz
- Language: English
- Subject: Economy
- Publisher: Atria Books
- Publication date: November 1, 2011
- Publication place: United States Canada
- Media type: Print (Hardcover
- Pages: 240
- ISBN: 978-1-4516-7186-5

The Impulse Economy: Understanding Mobile Shoppers and What Makes Them Buy is a book by Gary Schwartz that analyzes the evolution of mobile shopper behaviour. The book was first released in 2011 in the US and Canadian markets by Simon & Schuster, Atria imprint.

The Impulse Economy the first of a series of mobile marketing books published by Simon & Schuster. The second in the series, Fast Shopper, Slow Store, was published in 2012.

The Impulse Economy was the first NFC enabled "smart book". RFID stickers were placed on the cover of the book to allow book shopper with a NFC enabled phone to tap to instantly link to book information. Simon & Schuster calls this the first contactless book.

The online book abstract reads, "We live in a world where our mobile devices have become extensions of ourselves. We depend on them for instant connections to entertainment, social media, news, and deals. The phone has become our ticket, loyalty card, and catchall wallet. Networks are faster, phones are smarter, and the mobile shopper is ready to spend money now. What can a business do to maximize the mobile buying power of the new impulse consumer?"
