= Jerry Moore =

Jerry Moore may refer to:

- Jerry Moore (American football, born 1939), American football player and coach
- Jerry Moore (American football, born 1949), American football player
- Jerry Moore (baseball) (1855–1890), Major League Baseball player
- Jerry J. Moore (1927–2008), American real estate developer
- Jerry A. Moore Jr. (1918–2017), Baptist minister and politician in Washington, D.C.
