= Gerry Anderson (disambiguation) =

Gerry Anderson (1929–2012) was a British television producer who worked with marionettes.

Gerry Anderson may also refer to:

- Gerry Anderson (broadcaster) (1944–2014), Northern Irish radio broadcaster
- Gerry Anderson, director of the 2005 film No Rules

== See also ==
- Jerry Anderson (disambiguation)
- Gerald Anderson (disambiguation)
- Gerard Anderson (1889–1914), British hurdler
- Gary Anderson (disambiguation)
