= Gary R. Johnson =

American political scientist (born 1949)

Gary R. Johnson is an American political scientist who studies the evolutionary origins of political behavior. Johnson has argued that government and politics are natural phenomena found widely in nature. He has likewise argued that patriotism is a functional necessity in any stable biological or social system, and that patriotism is generated in large-scale human societies through the orchestration of psychological mechanisms that evolved originally under very different conditions. He says that loyalty to ethnic groups—as well as the nationalism that often grows out of such loyalty—is achieved through orchestrating these same mechanisms.

Johnson served as Editor of Politics and the Life Sciences from 1991 to 2001 and as executive director of the Association for Politics and the Life Sciences from 1996 to 2001. In the latter capacity, he organized association conferences in Boston, Atlanta, Washington DC, and Charleston. He also served in 2012-13 as President of the Michigan Political Science Association, which honored him in 2016 with its Founders Award for service to the association and contributions to the discipline.

Born in Shenandoah, Iowa in 1949, Johnson earned a B.A. in Political Science at Augustana College, Rock Island, Illinois (1972) and a Master of Arts (1975) and Ph.D. (1979) in Political Science at the University of Cincinnati. He became convinced in graduate school that political science did not understand why humans are political animals. That prompted him to branch out into anthropology and evolutionary biology.

Johnson is Professor Emeritus of Political Science at Lake Superior State University in Sault Ste. Marie, Michigan, where his academic career extended from 1978 to 2015. Among other roles there, he was the long-time chair of the Political Science Department. He was also a recipient of the university's Distinguished Teacher Award, as well as six awards for academic advising. Johnson is currently at work on an overview book on the evolutionary origins of government and politics.
