= Gary Sheffield (disambiguation) =

Gary Sheffield (born 1968) is a Major League Baseball player.

Gary Sheffield may also refer to:

- Gary Sheffield (bobsleigh) (1936–2004), American bobsledder
- Gary Sheffield (historian), British military historian
