= Jerry Anderson =

Jerry Anderson may refer to:

- Jerry Anderson (diver) (1932–2009), Puerto Rican diver
- Jerry Anderson (golfer) (1955–2018), Canadian golfer
- Jerry Anderson (American football coach) (born 1945), American football head coach
- Jerry Anderson (politician) (born 1935), American state legislator in Utah
- Jerry Anderson (safety) (1953–1989), American football safety
- Jerry Anderson, character in 40 Days and 40 Nights
- Jerry M. Anderson (1933–2008), American professor and academic administrator

== See also ==
- Gerry Anderson (disambiguation)
- Jeremy Anderson (disambiguation)
- Jerome Anderson (disambiguation)
- Jeremiah Anderson (disambiguation)
