= Gary Marx (disambiguation) =

Gary Marx is a musician.

Gary Marx or Marks may also refer to:

- Gary T. Marx (born 1938), sociologist
- Gary Marks (born 1952), political scientist
- Gary Marks (golfer) (born 1953), English golfer
