= Gary Stern (disambiguation) =

Gary Stern is an American economist and banker.

Gary Stern may also refer to:

- Gary Stern of Stern Pinball
- Gary Stern, character in Daybreak (2019 TV series)
- Gary Stern, co-owner of the Montreal Alouettes
