= Gary Alexander (martial art pioneer) =

American martial artist

Gary R. Alexander was (died September 25, 2025) an American martial artist, karate fighter, author and actor. He was Black Belt Magazine's Co-Instructor of the Year (1974) and is known as the "First International Bare Knuckle Contact Karate Champion.

Alexander began formally training in Isshin-ryu karate under Don Nagle at the Jersey City, NJ YMCA in the fall of 1959.

On November 17, 1962, as a 3rd Dan, Gary Alexander won the 1st Canadian Karate Championship sponsored by Mas Tsuruoka. The very next weekend, on November 24, 1962, Alexander won the North American Championship sponsored by Mas Oyama, which was held at the Madison Square Garden. Both events consisted of bare-knuckle full-contact matches, whereas the winner was the fighter still standing.

Alexander is a 1974 inductee of the Black Belt Magazine Hall of Fame, the Action Martial Arts Hall of Fame, the World Karate Union Hall of Fame, and the Australasian Martial Arts Hall of Fame.

Gary Alexander is a U.S. Marine Corps veteran who served in the Pacific with Weapons Company, 1st Battalion, 9th Marines, Fleet Marine Force during the mid-to-late 1950s, and has acted in films and on television, specifically Avenging Force (1986) with Michael Dudikoff for Cannon Films and Gideon Oliver (1989) with Lou Gossett, Jr. for Universal Pictures.

He is also the producer and star of a series of twenty martial arts instructional videos and is also the author of "Unarmed and Dangerous, Hand to Hand Combat and Defense Systems".
