= Gary Peters (disambiguation) =

Gary Peters (born 1958) is a U.S. Senator for Michigan.

Gary Peters may also refer to:

- Gary Peters (baseball) (1937–2023), American Major League Baseball pitcher
- Gary Peters (footballer) (born 1954), English footballer and manager

== See also ==
- Garry Peters (disambiguation)
