= Gary Gill (disambiguation) =

Gary Gill may refer to:

- Gary Gill (born 1964), English footballer
- Gary Gill (politician), Honolulu City Council Member from 1987 to 1994
- Gary Gill, Natural Law candidate in the Washington secretary of state election, 1996
- Gary P. Gill, Natural Law candidate in 1992 for Twickenham (UK Parliament constituency)
