= Barry Little =

English footballer

Personal information
- Date of birth: 25 August 1964
- Place of birth: Greenwich, England
- Date of death: 18 September 1994 (aged 30)
- Place of death: Greenwich, England
- Position: Midfielder

Senior career*
Years	Team	Apps	(Gls)
1982–1983	Charlton Athletic	2	(1)
1984	Gillingham	0	(0)
1984–1985	Dagenham	39	(3)
1985–1987	Barnet	72	(8)
1987	→ Wycombe Wanderers (loan)	5	(0)
1987–1991	Fisher Athletic	147	(12)
1991–1993	Dover Athletic		
Total		265	(24)

International career
1982	England U17	3	(1)
1982–1983	England Youth	8	(0)
- * Club domestic league appearances and goals

Barry Brian Little (25 August 1964 – 18 September 1994) was an English professional footballer who played in the Football League as a midfielder. He died of a brain tumour in 1994
