= Lotti Fraser =

English actress and singer

- Born: Charlotte Elizabeth Fraser; 18 June 1989 (age 37); Greenwich, London; United Kingdom
- Occupation: Actress
- Years active: 2008-Present

Lotti Fraser (born 18 June 1989) is an English actress and singer. Fraser studied Drama and English in London and Miami.

== Career ==
She has appeared in the British children's television program Crisis Control, and appeared in the 2011 American comedy film The Hangover Part II. Fraser retired from acting in her mid-20s.

Since 2014, Fraser has become known for her philanthropic pursuits, with a particular interest in international development and human rights across Southeast Asia and Norfolk, England.
