= Gary Shapiro (journalist) =

Gary Shapiro is an American journalist. A graduate of Harvard University and Columbia Law School he has written for numerous publications including The New York Sun (where he penned the "Knickerbocker" column) , The Forward and The Wall Street Journal. He is also a former contributing editor to The American Scholar magazine.

While at the New York Sun he wrote on the Frederick Brockway Gleason III case in Savannah, Georgia. The victim was a direct descendant of the family which had once published the New York Sun's forerunner The Sun.

Shapiro formerly served on the board of directors and is the current admissions committee chair of the National Arts Club in New York City. He also was a board member of the National Coalition of Independent Scholars and served out a term which ended in 2014.
