= Gary Wood (disambiguation) =

Gary or Garry Wood is the name of:

- Gary Wood (1942–1994), American football player
- Gary Wood (filmmaker), independent filmmaker
- Garry Wood (born 1988), Scottish footballer
