= Gary Cohen (health advocate) =

Environmental health advocate

- Education: Clark University
- Scientific career
- Fields: Environmental activism
- Workplaces: Health Care Without Harm

Gary Cohen is an American environmental activist and health advocate. In 1996 he co-founded Health Care Without Harm, an organization that advocates for health-care corporations and hospitals to adopt more environmentally friendly practices, especially in regards to climate change. For example, they advocate for increased professional training for staff and doctors and for the cessation of incinerating medical waste. He was awarded a MacArthur Fellowship in 2015.
