= Gary Gilmore (disambiguation) =

Gary Gilmore (1940–1977) was an American criminal who was the first person to be executed after the US ban on capital punishment was lifted in 1976.

Gary Gilmore may also refer to:

- Gary Gilmore (baseball), American college baseball coach who is currently the head coach of the Coastal Carolina Chanticleers
- Gary Gilmore (politician), New Hampshire state legislator

== See also ==
- Gary Gilmour (1951–2014), Australian cricketer who played 1969–1981
- Gary Gilmore's Eyes, 1977 song by English punk rock band The Adverts
