= Syd Ellis =

English footballer

Personal information
- Full name: Sydney Carey Ellis
- Date of birth: 16 August 1931
- Place of birth: Charlton, London, England
- Date of death: March 2001 (age 69)
- Place of death: Greenwich, London, England
- Position: Left back

Youth career
- Crystal Palace

Senior career*
Years	Team	Apps	(Gls)
1953–1958	Charlton Athletic	48	(0)
1958–1959	Brighton & Hove Albion	42	(0)
	Guildford City	?	(?)
Total		90	(0)

International career
1954	England U23	1	(0)
	England B	1	(0)
- * Club domestic league appearances and goals

Sydney Carey Ellis (16 August 1931 – 2001) was an English footballer who played as a full back in the Football League.
