= Gary Patterson (artist) =

American cartoonist (born 1941)

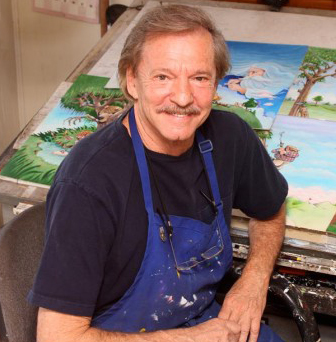
- Born: November 16, 1941 (age 83); Los Angeles, California, U.S.
- Occupation(s): Cartoonist, artist
- Years active: 1966–present
- Website: garypatterson.com

Gary Robert Patterson (born November 16, 1941) is an American cartoonist known for his distinctive works that humorously depict the potential pitfalls inherent in sports, the daily dramas that occur at the workplace, and hilarious portraits of pets - all in predicaments that help people appreciate and laugh at the lighter side of life.

== Early life ==
Patterson was born in Los Angeles, California, on November 16, 1941. His father, Robert Patterson, was a Fire Captain for the Los Angeles Fire Department who was also known for his comical illustrations in the Firemen's Grapevine, a widely distributed periodical popular among firefighters. His mother, Nadine Patterson, was a homemaker. In the beginning of his childhood, Patterson submerged himself into the world of art. Encouraged by his family and friends, he attended Los Angeles Valley College, the Art Center College of Design and UCLA where he studied a diversity of art areas and media before deciding to specialize in humor.

== Career ==
Patterson began his career by taking on every ethical art assignment he could find, whether it was designing brochures, doing wall murals or even painting addresses on curbs. His dedication began to pay off in the 1970s, when his art work was exhibited as one-man shows in galleries and major department stores. He also created artwork for large corporations, including Hallmark and Sony, and received numerous awards for his efforts. He was Art Director for the 1970 Academy Award-winning short film "The Magic Machines" and received an Award of Excellence from the Los Angeles Fire Department in 1976.

Beginning in the 1980s, Patterson concentrated on creating humorous illustrations that were produced on numerous commercial products and accepted into the Los Angeles County Museum of Art and Basketball Hall of Fame. In addition, his cartoons were featured in promotional campaigns nationwide for corporations including Subway, Pepsi-Cola, Crystal Light, 7-Eleven and Circle K.

Today, Patterson's work remains active and substantially successful in the international market. More than thirteen million prints, ten million calendars, and several millions of checks and greeting cards featuring Patterson's illustrations have been bought, sold, mailed and given throughout the world.

== Personal life ==
A native Californian, Patterson resides in Malibu and works out of an art studio above his home.
