= Christine Watkins =

American politician (born 1950)

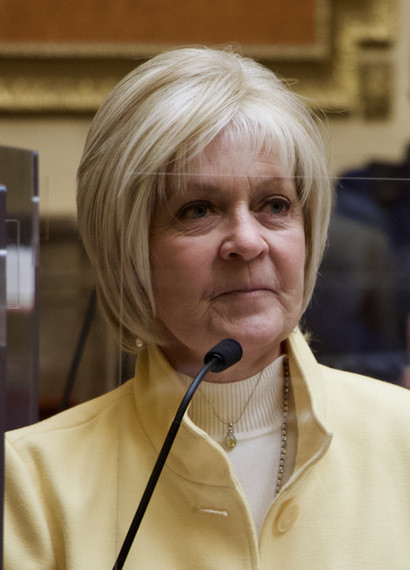

Member of the Utah House of Representatives
- Incumbent
- Assumed office January 1, 2017
- Preceded by: Brad King
- Succeeded by: JR Bird (elect)
- Constituency: 69th district (2017–2023); 67th district (2023–present)

Personal details
- Born: May 18, 1950 (age 76)
- Party: Republican (2012–present); Democratic (before 2012)

Christine Watkins (born 1950) is an American politician serving in the Utah House of Representatives, representing District 67.

== Early life and career ==
Watkins lives in Carbon County. Her husband was a city councilman in Castle Dale. She has a B.S. in Elementary Education from Utah State University, three Special Education Endorsements from BYU, and a Master's of Educational Leadership from the University of Utah. Watkins served on the Castle Dale City Planning and Zoning board, and also held leadership positions in the Emery Education Association. She served as the executive director for the Southeastern Utah UniServ.

== Political career ==
Prior to the 2018 election, Watkins had served a total of six years in the Utah House of Representatives: from 2009 through 2012, and again from 2017 to the present. After losing her bid for reelection in 2012, she switched party affiliation from the Democratic Party to the Republican Party. In 2016, she defeated Democratic incumbent Brad King. In 2018, Rep. Watkins ran as the Republican incumbent serving a two-year term that began on Jan. 1, 2017, and defeated Democratic challenger Tim Glenn.

During the 2022 General Session, Watkins served on the Business, Economic Development, and Labor Appropriations Subcommittee, House Education Committee, and House Natural Resources, Agriculture, and Environment Committee.

== See also ==
- List of American politicians who switched parties in office

== Notable legislation ==
- 2022- Representative Watkins ran HB 166 which modifies criminal and civil provisions related to water facilities, including defining terms, repealing language, and amending criminal intent provisions; clarifies award of attorney fees and costs; and addresses scope of the section. The bill passed unanimously out of the House Natural Resources, Agriculture, and Environment Committee, and would go on to pass unanimously as well on the House floor, Senate committee, and Senate floor.
- 2022- Representative Watkins ran HB 292 which amends the 2018 edition of the International Fire Code to provide an exemption from the Type 1 hood requirement for a cooking appliance in a permitted microenterprise home kitchen. The bill passed unanimously in the House Political Subdivisions Committee, House floor, Senate Economic Development and Workforce Services Committee, and Senate floor.

== 2022 sponsored legislation ==
Bill	Status
HB 64- Drinking Water Amendments	House/ filed 3/4/22
HB 156- Sales and Use Tax Refund Amendments	House/ filed 3/4/22
HB 166- Water Facility Amendments	House/ to Governor 3/10/22
HB 207- Inmate Treatment Amendments	House/ filed 3/4/22
HB 292- Microenterprise Home Kitchen Amendments	House/ to Governor 3/10/22
HB 379- Association of Governments Amendments	House/ filed 3/4/2022
