= Gary Cohn (disambiguation) =

Gary Cohn, (born 1960), venture capital investor, is the former director of the National Economic Council under President Donald Trump, and was the chief operating officer of Goldman Sachs.

Gary Cohn may also refer to:

- Gary Cohn (comics) (born 1952), American comic book writer
- Gary Cohn (journalist) (1952–2024), American journalist

== See also ==
- Gary Cohen (disambiguation)
- Roy Cohn
