= Gary Barnett (disambiguation) =

Gary Barnett (born 1946) is a former American football coach.

Gary Barnett is also the name of:

- Gary Barnett (footballer) (born 1963), English association football player
- Gary Barnett (real estate developer) (born 1956)
