= Gary N. Ross =

Businessperson

Gary N. Ross is an energy economist and the Executive Chairman and Head of Global Oil for PIRA, an international energy analytics firm, where he oversees short-, medium-, and long-term oil market forecasts. He has guided PIRA Energy Group since its founding in 1976. He is a speaker at industry seminars and conferences in the U.S. and abroad, covering a range of energy topics, and is a commentator on CNBC and CNN, as well as the Financial Times and The New York Times. He is also a member of the Council on Foreign Relations.

Dr. Gary N. Ross has a PhD in economics from the City University of New York.
