= Gary Hill (disambiguation) =

Gary Hill is an American artist.

Gary or Garry Hill may also refer to:

- Gary Hill (American football) (1943–2026), American football player
- Gary Hill (basketball) (1941–2009), basketball player
- Garry Hill (born 1959), English football manager
- Garry Hill (baseball) (1946–2017), American baseball player
- Garry Hill (rugby) (born 1987), Barbarian International Rugby player
