= Gary Wright (disambiguation) =

Gary Wright (1943–2023) was an American singer-songwriter and keyboardist.

Gary Wright may also refer to:

- Gary Wright (cricketer) (born 1970), Australian cricketer
- Gary Wright (ice hockey) (fl. 1972–present), American ice hockey coach
- Gary Wright (racing driver) (born 1958), American racing driver

== See also ==
- Gary Wraight (born 1979), English footballer
- Gareth Wright (born 1981), Welsh professional golfer
- Gerry Wright (disambiguation)
