= Gary Davies (disambiguation) =

Gary Davies may refer to:

- Gary Davies (born 1954), DJ
- Gary Davies (boxer) (born 1982), British bantamweight boxer

== See also ==
- Gareth Davies (disambiguation)
- Gary Davis (disambiguation)
