= Sweet and Sour (2000 talk show) =

- Genre: Talk show
- Created by: Lena Andel
- Presented by: Adam Webb (2000-2001); Gary Mitchell (2001-present)
- Country of origin: Australia
- Original language: English
- No. of seasons: 17
- No. of episodes: 600+

Production
- Executive producers: Gary Mitchell; Lawry Hill
- Producer: Travis Murton
- Production location: Perth
- Running time: 30 minutes
- Production companies: Sweet and Sour Productions

Original release
- Network: West TV; Westlink; 44 Adelaide; C31 Melbourne
- Release: July 2000 – present

Sweet and Sour is an Australian television talk show produced in Perth, Western Australia. It is filmed at the Central Institute of Technology, and is screened across Australia on Community Television stations. The show debuted in July 2000, and originally was supposed to run for just eight episodes.

Originally produced by Lena Andel and hosted by Adam Webb, the series became a magnet for local Perthonalities to appear on and show community support for the newly formed TV station. Many such notables appeared on the show including Basil Zemplias, Dennis Commetti, Chris Mainwairing, Jeremy Fernandez, and others who would go on to brighter futures in the media, politics, and music.

== Overview ==
Sweet & Sour is a community orientated talk show in which people can write in and share their situation to a panel who helps to solve them. The panel consists of the talk show host, Gary Mitchell, and a rotating panel of special guests.

The show is produced entirely by screen media students who are currently studying in Western Australia. The show is filmed in the studio of the Central Institute of Technology in Perth and is hosted by Gary Mitchell.

=== The Host ===
Executive Producer Gary Mitchell has been the host of Sweet and Sour for over 10 years; his first episode was broadcast on 11 September 2001. He was compared to the 2004 National Community TV Awards, The Antennas, broadcast from Melbourne, when Sweet and Sour won its first big gong, the award for Australia's Best Panel Show.

== Guests ==
Many thousands of guests have appeared on the show throughout the years including Tony Barber, Justin Langer, Kim Hughes, Sam Newman, Barry Crocker, Dannii Minogue, Normi Rowe, Johnny Young, Bambi LeFist, Paige Piper, Alex Andra, and Lucy Nicol.

== Awards ==
- 2004 - Australia's Best Panel Show - Antenna Awards
