= Gary Russell (disambiguation) =

Gary Russell (born 1963) is a British writer and former child actor.

Gary Russell may also refer to:

- Gary Russell Jr. (born 1988), American professional boxer
- Gary Allen Russell (born 1993), American amateur boxer, brother of Gary Russell, Jr.
- Gary Antuanne Russell (born 1996), American amateur boxer, brother of Gary Russell, Jr. and Gary Allen Russell
- Gary Antonio Russell (born 1993), American professional boxer
- Gary Russell (American football) (born 1986), American football running back

== See also ==
- Russell Gary (1959–2019), American football defensive back
