= Gary L. Johnson =

American scientist and professor

- Citizenship: American
- Occupation: Professor
- Board member of: American Association for Cancer Research (AACR)
- Awards: Kenan Distinguished Professor Hyman L. Battle Distinguished Cancer Research Award

Academic background
- Education: California State University, Northridge University of Colorado Medical School University of California, San Francisco

Academic work
- Discipline: Pharmacology, Cellular Biology,

Gary L. Johnson is an American scientist and Professor recognized for his work with oncogenes and stem cells in the fields of molecular pharmacology and cancer cell biology. His other research interests include signaling networks controlling cell function and disease and the behavior of the kinome en masse in cancer.

Johnson is a past Kenan Distinguished Professor, chair of the UNC Chapel Hill Department of Pharmacology, and a member of the UNC Lineberger Comprehensive Cancer Center.

== Education ==
Johnson earned his B.A. in Biology in 1971 at Cal State Northridge, where he graduated Magna Cum Laude, and his Ph.D. in Pharmacology in 1976 at the University of Colorado Medical School. He then completed his PostDoc in 1979 at the University of California, San Francisco. He served as the chair of the Department of Pharmacology at UNC Chapel Hill from 2003 to 2017 and was a Kenan Distinguished Professor from 2011 to 2019. During his time in education, Johnson trained over 80 postdoctoral fellows and PhD students. Now, Johnson works as the co-director of the Program in Molecular Therapeutics for the Lineberger Comprehensive Cancer Center and director of the Human Genome RNAi/CRISPR Screening Facility.

== Work ==
From 1994 to 1999, Johnson served as the Director of Cell Biology for Cadus Pharmaceuticals Inc. He worked four years as a consultant for Atherogenics, Inc. He was a co-founder of KinoDyn, Inc., a biotech company located in Chapel Hill, NC.

== Research ==
Johnson has made many contributions to the fields of molecular pharmacology and cell biology. In the early 90s, his laboratories demonstrated that oncogenes, such as Ras and Src, activated the MAPK, ERK1/2. This research defined the MAPK signaling network as part a large network of MAP3Ks, MAP2Ks, and MAPKs. They defined the role MAPKs in proliferation, apoptosis, migration, and invasion. His laboratory published 250 MAPK network related papers. His lab was one to demonstrate that agonists targeting the same GPCR have "biased agonism" and "asymmetric signaling." This is when agonists activate signaling pathways at different distinct intensities. In his work with stem cells, they defined a mutation that captured self-renewing tissue stem cell in a permanent state of EMT. The lab has also made advancements in Adaptive Kinome Programming. They defined the adaptive bypass mechanisms that result in the lack of durable responses to targeted kinase inhibitors. Overall, Johnson has over 300 published papers

== Awards and recognition ==
In 2018, Johnson was awarded the Hyman L. Battle Award for Cancer Research. In 2008, he won a Merit Award from the National Institute of General Medical Sciences.
