= Long Beach Jane Doe =

Unidentified murder victim

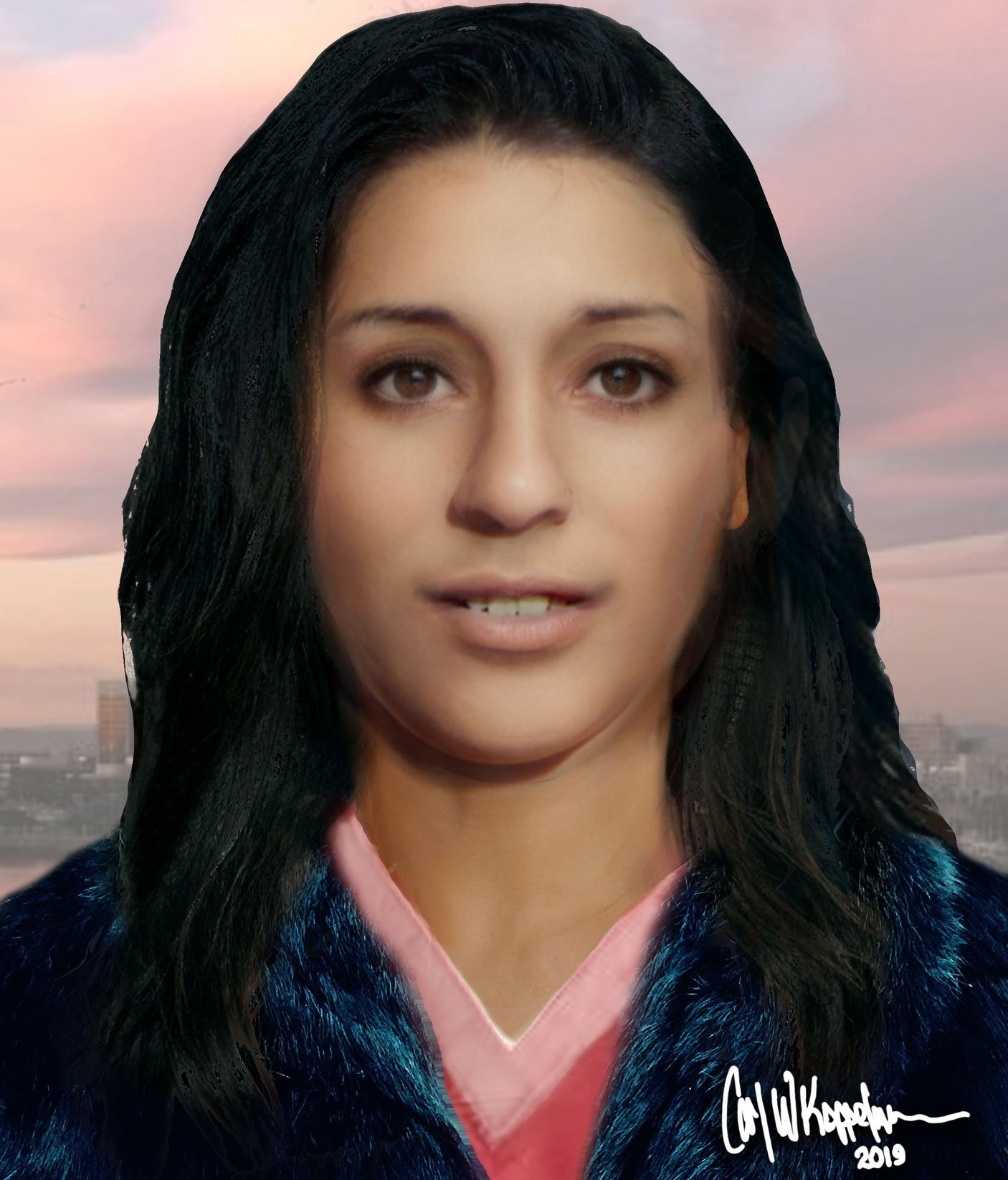
- Facial approximation of the victim
- Born: 1946–56 (approximate)
- Status: Unidentified for 52 years, 3 months and 2 days
- Died: May 27, 1974 (aged 18–28); Long Beach, California, U.S.
- Cause of death: Homicide by strangulation
- Other name: Jane Doe 40 "Anna"
- Known for: Unidentified victim of homicide
- Height: Approximately 5 ft 5 in (1.65 m)

The Long Beach Jane Doe (known locally as Jane Doe 40) is an unidentified murder victim whose body was found on May 28, 1974. Her suspected murderer was arrested in 2013, but she has never been identified, despite extensive investigation.

== Discovery of the body ==
The strangled body of a young woman was found on May 28, 1974, on the jetty of Alamitos Beach in Long Beach, California.

She was estimated to be between 18 and 28 years old and had been raped. Basic physical examination showed she was about 5 feet 5 inches tall and weighed about 118 pounds. The victim was white with possible Hispanic ancestry, as she had brown or black hair and brown eyes. She also had a unique scar on the back of her left hand, which was shaped like the letter T. She also had an inch-long scar on the back of her left thigh.

She was wearing a white gold, 14-karat engagement ring with a small diamond. She was clothed in a pinkish-orange pants suit with a faux black fur coat and calf-high suede boots.

The only items the Jane Doe carried were a house key and padlock key. The padlock key was attached to a broken chain.

== Investigation ==
No missing persons have been found who match the victim's description. Cold case investigators have announced there is no survivable evidence that can be used to test for DNA. A forensic facial reconstruction was created by the National Center for Missing and Exploited Children to assist with identification.

=== Arrest of Gary Stamp ===
Police received a confession from a Texas man who claimed he had assisted with dumping the victim's body. He led authorities to another suspect.

On May 20, 2013, Gary Stamp, aged 61, was arrested. He confessed to killing her following meeting her at a bar, but was not certain of her name, which he suggested may have been "Ana" or "Anna". Stamp was arraigned on June 12, 2013, in Superior Court.

Stamp told police that he had met her at a bar, which coincided with the prior evidence that the victim was possibly seen at an establishment of this nature. Stamp died in January 2014 of cancer in police custody.

== See also ==
- List of unsolved murders (1900–1979)

== Gallery ==
Reconstruction by NCMEC

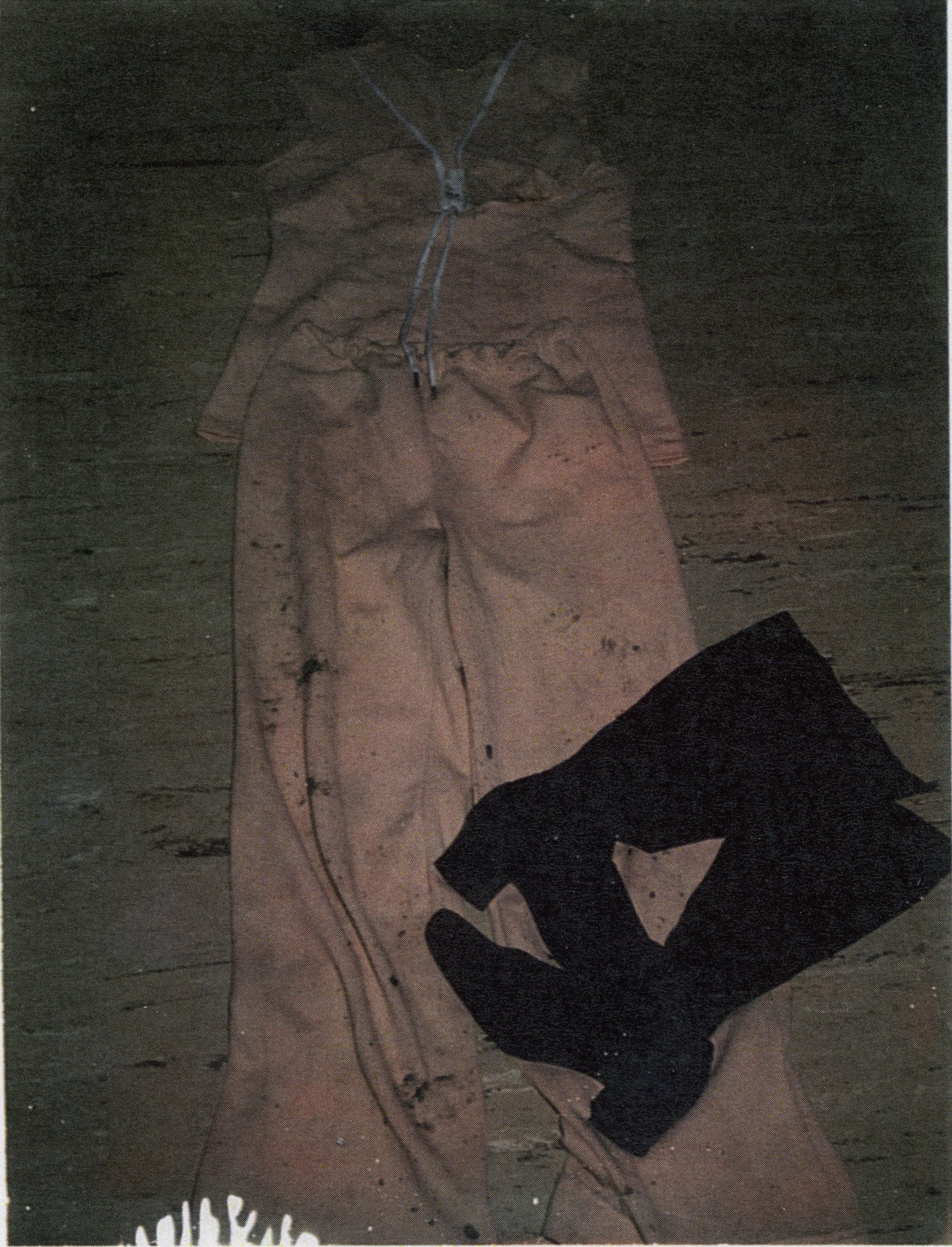
Clothing worn by the victim

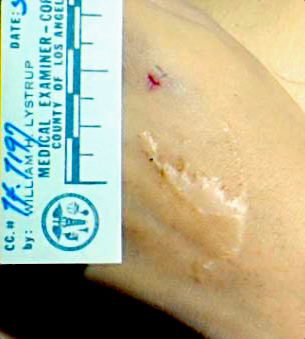
Scar on hand

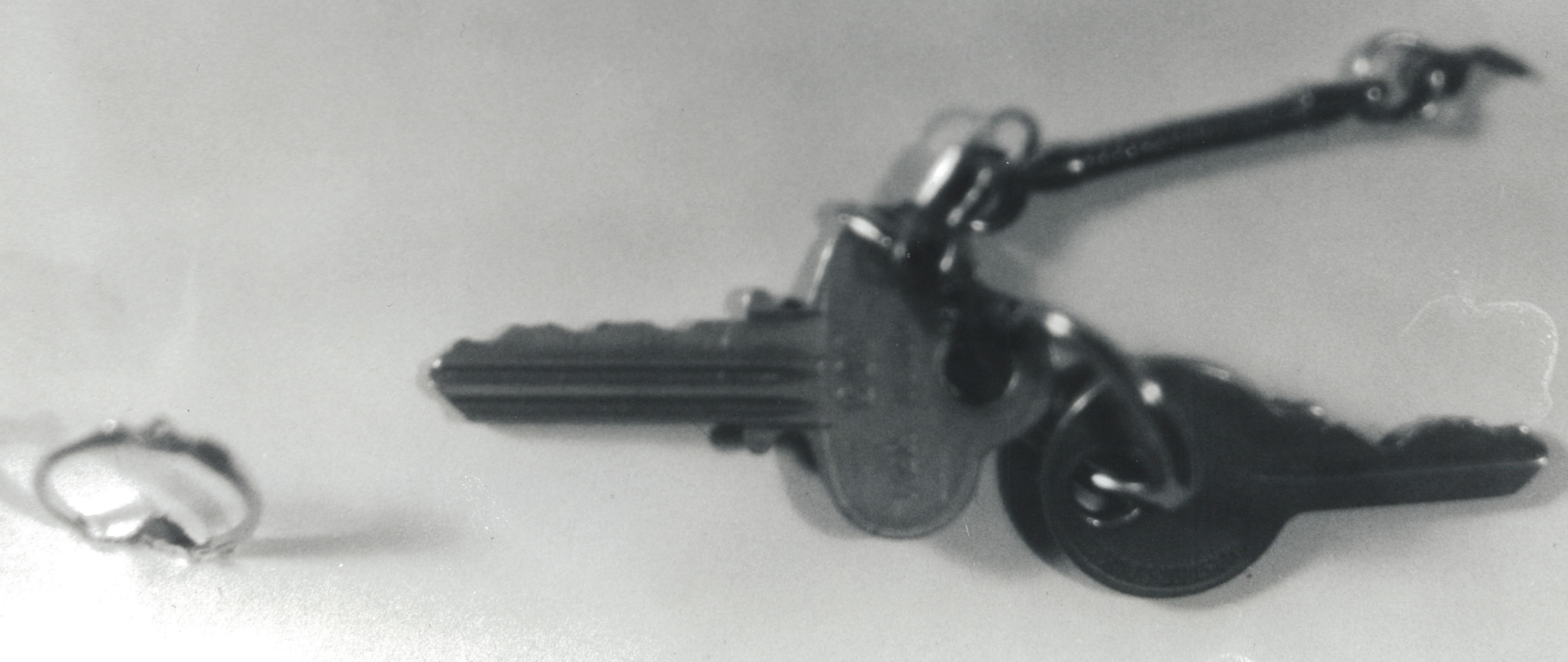
Keys and ring associated with the body

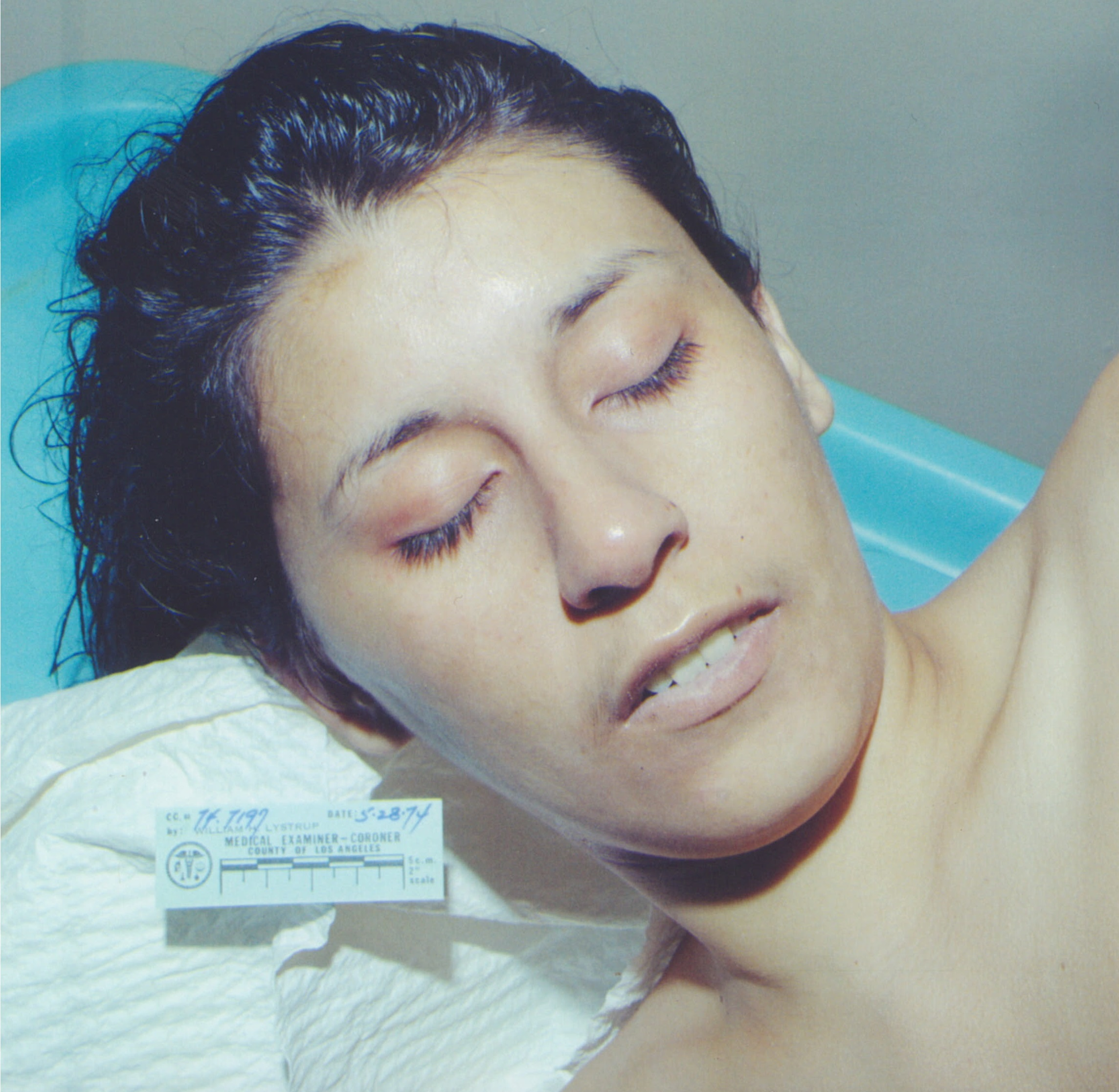
Mugshot of the corpse in the morgue
