= Gary Wilson =

Gary Wilson may refer to:

- Gary L. Wilson, American businessman
- Gary Wilson (writer) (1956–2021), American writer and activist
- Gary Wilson (politician) (born 1946), Canadian politician
- Gary Wilson (musician) (born 1953), American experimental musician
- Gary Wilson (snooker player) (born 1985), English snooker player
- Gary Wilson (cricketer) (born 1986), Irish cricketer
- Gary Wilson (racing driver), former American racing driver, see 1975 Long Beach Grand Prix
- Gary Wilson (rugby union), rugby union footballer who represented the United States

== Baseball ==
- Gary Wilson (second baseman) (1879–1969), Major League Baseball second baseman for the Boston Americans
- Gary Wilson (1970s pitcher) (born 1954), former Major League Baseball pitcher for the Houston Astros
- Gary Wilson (1990s pitcher) (born 1970), former Major League Baseball pitcher for the Pittsburgh Pirates

== See also ==
- Garry Wilson (born 1953), Australian rules footballer (nicknamed "Flea")
- Garry Wilson (Scottish footballer) (born 1963), former Scottish footballer
