= Gary Graham (disambiguation) =

Gary Graham (1950–2024) was an American television actor.

Gary Graham may also refer to:

- Shaka Sankofa (Gary Lee Graham, 1963–2000), executed in Texas for crimes committed at age 17
- Gary Graham (musician) (born 1945), Canadian musician and educator
- Gary Graham (fashion designer) (born 1969), American fashion designer and artist
- Gary Graham (rugby union) (born 1992), Scottish rugby union player
- Gary Graham (cricketer) (born 1982), Jamaican cricketer
