= Gary Locke (disambiguation) =

Gary Locke (born 1950) is an American politician, attorney, and former diplomat.

Gary Locke may also refer to:

- Gary Locke (director) (born 1949), founding director of the RCC Marching Tigers
- Gary Locke (English footballer) (born 1954), English former footballer
- Gary Locke (Scottish footballer) (born 1975), Scottish football manager and former footballer

== See also ==
- Gary Lauk (born 1940), lawyer and political figure in British Columbia
- Gary Lock (fl. 1990s–2010s), British archaeologist
