= Gary Matthews (disambiguation) =

Gary Matthews (born 1950) is an American baseball player and coach and broadcaster, father of Gary Matthews, Jr.

Gary Matthews may also refer to:

- Gary Matthews Jr. (born 1974), American baseball player, son of Gary Matthews
- Gary Matthews (politician) (born 1951), American politician from Montana
