= Gary Johnston =

Australian rules footballer

Personal information
- Full name: Gary Johnston
- Born: 29 April 1941 (age 85)
- Original team: Melton
- Height: 177 cm (5 ft 10 in)
- Weight: 77 kg (170 lb)

Playing career^{1}
Years	Club	Games (Goals)
1963–64	South Melbourne	27 (1)
- ^{1} Playing statistics correct to the end of 1964.

Gary Johnston (born 29 April 1941) is a former Australian rules footballer who played with South Melbourne in the Victorian Football League (VFL).
