= Jerry J. Moore =

American real estate developer

- Born: 1927; Houston, Texas
- Died: November 23, 2008 (age 80)
- Spouse: Jean H. Moore
- Children: 3

Jerry J. Moore (1927–2008) was an American real estate developer and by 1989, he was the largest shopping-center developer in the United States.

== Biography ==
Moore was born in Houston to Polish-Jewish immigrants in 1927, the son of a plumber. He attended San Jacinto High School in Houston but dropped out after sophomore year to sell vacuum cleaners door-to-door (he would later earn a high school equivalency diploma in 1987). In 1958, he founded Jerry J. Moore Investments, and after borrowing money from banker Irvin Shlenker (father of Sidney Shlenker), he purchased a small house in North Houston which he fixed up and sold. Using the proceeds he repeated the same pattern, purchasing houses, small apartment buildings, and strip malls primarily in working-class neighborhoods in Houston. In the mid 1960s, he focused on finding run-down strip malls in high-traffic areas and after sprucing them up, he would increase the rent anywhere from 20 to 40 percent. He was able to undercut his competitors who focused on new construction as he used his own workers for renovation and maintenance. The strategy was very successful and he soon stopped renovating houses and apartments to focus on strip malls and then began purchasing full-fledged shopping malls. By 1989, he was the largest shopping-center developer in the United States with more than 160 properties and 19 million square feet of space in Texas of which 70 percent was in greater Houston. In 1991, Texas Monthly ranked him the third richest Texan.

In 1993, he planned to take his company public as a real estate investment trust and hired Kidder Peabody but the appetite for new REITs had soured. In 1994, he again contemplated going public in partnership with Morgan Stanley who was interested in buying his portfolio. In January 1995, Morgan Stanley agreed to purchase a controlling interest in 50 percent of Moore's properties for $400 million (although $300 million was in assumed debt). In 1997, after his two-year non-competition agreement with Morgan Stanley ended, Moore returned to purchasing shopping malls. His net worth was then estimated at between $600 million and $800 million.

== Personal life ==
In 1955, he married Jean H. Moore; they had three children: Terri Moore Conwell; Jeff Moore; and Shelly Moore. He died on November 23, 2008, and was buried at Beth Yeshurun Cemetery.

Moore purchased an eighteenth-century French château that had been transplanted to Texas brick-by-brick. Moore also had an extensive car collection with over 700 antique cars including thirty Duesenbergs. Most of his assets were allocated to limited partnerships so that his children would not have to pay estate taxes after his death.

Moore's creed was "A dollar borrowed is a dollar earned."
