= Gary Webb (disambiguation) =

Gary Webb (1955–2004) was an American investigative reporter.

Gary Webb may also refer to:

- Gary Webb (racing driver) (born 1949), American racing driver
- Gary Webb (artist) (born 1973), British artist
- Gary Numan (born 1958), English musician, real name Gary Webb
- Gary Webb (golfer) (born 1961), American professional golfer

== See also ==
- Garry Webb, Australian criminal also known as Garry David
