= Brad King (politician) =

American politician (born 1956)

Member of the Utah House of Representatives from the 69th district
- In office 1997–2008
- Succeeded by: Christine Watkins
- In office 2014–2016
- Preceded by: Christine Watkins
- Succeeded by: Christine Watkins

Personal details
- Born: February 12, 1956 (age 70)
- Party: Democratic Party
- Spouse: Tami
- Education: Brigham Young University
- Occupation: educator

Brad King (born February 12, 1956) is a former Democratic member of the Utah State House of Representatives, representing the state's 69th house district in Price from 1997 to 2008. He served as the Minority Leader in the Utah House during 2008. He left his seat to run for State Senate in 2008, a race which he lost to David Hinkins. He then ran again for reelection in 2014.

== Personal life and education ==
King was born on February 12, 1956. He is married to his wife Tami. He grew up in Price, Utah, where he currently resides.

King received an Associate in Science from the College of Eastern Utah. He went onto achieve a Bachelor of Science and Master of Science from Brigham Young University. King led a career as an educator, but is currently retired.

== Political career ==
King was elected as Representative to the Utah State House in 1996, for which he served consecutively through 2008. In 2007, he served as Minority Whip, and in 2008 he served as Minority Leader. In 2008, he ran for Utah State Senate in District 27 and lost, losing his House seat. In 2014, King sought the State House seat again. He was unopposed in the Democratic convention and won the general election on November 4, 2014 with 5,298 votes (55.6%) against Republican nominee Bill Labrum.

In the 2016 legislative session, King served on the Infrastructure and General Government Appropriations Subcommittee, House Business and Labor Committee, House Rules Committee and the House Transportation Committee.

== Organizations ==
King has been a member of the following organizations:

- Honorary Colonel, Utah Highway Patrol, present
- Past President, Utah Professionals in Student Activities
- Past President, Utah School Counselors Association
- Utah Public Employees' Association

== 2016 sponsored legislation ==
Bill Number	Bill Title	Status
HB0278	Candidate Financial Disclosure Amendments	House/ filed - 3/10/2016

King floor sponsored SB 69 Children's Heart Disease Special Group License Plates and SB 195 Highway Bridge Designation Amendments.

== See also ==
- List of Utah State Legislatures
- Utah Democratic Party
- Utah Republican Party
- Utah House of Representatives
