= Senator Gary (disambiguation) =

Frank B. Gary (1860–1922) was a U.S. Senator from South Carolina from 1908 to 1909. Senator Gary may also refer to:

- George Gary (1824–1909), Wisconsin State Senate
- Martin Witherspoon Gary (1831–1881), South Carolina State Senate
- Raymond D. Gary (1908–1993), Oklahoma State Senate
