= Gary Beck (disambiguation) =

Gary Beck (born 1941) is a drag racing driver.

Gary Beck may also refer to:

- Gary Beck (fictional character), in City Homicide (series 4)
- Gary Beck (producer), techno producer, see RockNess 2010
- Gary Beck (RAAF officer), see List of Royal Australian Air Force air marshals
