= Gary Coleman (disambiguation) =

Gary Coleman (1968–2010) was an American actor.

Gary Coleman may also refer to:

- Gary Coleman (Gaelic footballer) (born 1972), Irish Gaelic football player who played for Derry
- Gary J. Coleman (born 1941), American leader in The Church of Jesus Christ of Latter-day Saints
- Gary B.B. Coleman (1947–1994), American blues musician and record producer

== See also ==
- Gary Cole (born 1956), American actor
- The Gary Coleman Show
