= Gary Schwartz (designer) =

American technology entrepreneur

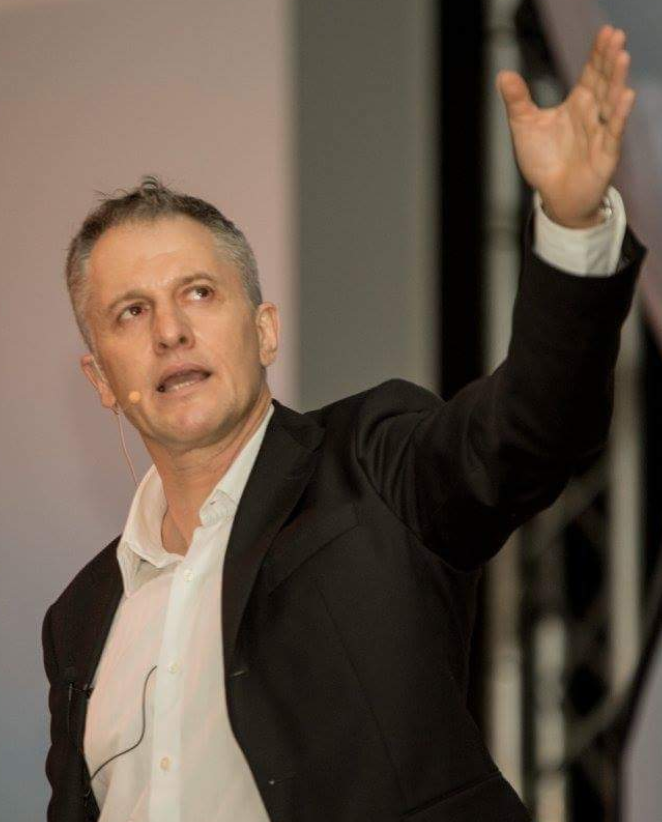
- Gary Schwartz at TEDx
- Born: Kitwe, Zambia
- Education: Columbia University
- Occupations: investor; entrepreneur
- Title: President of the Canadian Lenders Association; Founder-CEO of Impact Mobile Cisco; Chair Emeritus Interactive Advertising Bureau; Chair Emeritus Mobile Entertainment Forum; Director Location-Based Marketing Association
- Website: www.ifthingscouldspeak.com

Gary Schwartz is a technology entrepreneur and investor in the United States and is the author of "The Impulse economy: Understanding Mobile Shoppers and What Makes Them Buy" and FAST SHOPPER. SLOW STORE published by Simon & Schuster.

Schwartz is the recipient of the Japan Foundation Fellowship in 1988, The Asia Foundation Fellowship 1989, Macromedia People Choice Award and the Geraldine R. Dodge Foundation award for innovation 1996, IAB award for industry excellence in 2009, the MEF award for industry excellence in 2010., in 2013 was recognized as the "Mobile Commerce Evangelist of the Year." and in 2014 was selected as the "Retail Innovator of the Year."

Schwartz worked as a journalist and editor in Japan from 1988 through 1992 for U.S. News & World Report as well as The Asia Foundation's Op-Ed Division. He was producer and anchor for TV Asahi and Japan's startup music channel "SpaceShower". Subsequently, Schwartz worked with CTB/McGraw-Hill, Scholastic Corporation, UNICEF and the World Bank Group developing new media guidelines and programming.

In 1996, Schwartz published My City with CTB/McGraw-Hill and Scholastic Corporation and continued to develop the Street Business Toolkit with Street Kids International working with street children and street organizations in Nicaragua, Ecuador, Tanzania, Kenya, Thailand and Nepal.

In 2002, as CEO of Impact Mobile, Schwartz developed best practices and standards for the first cross-carrier mobile marketing short code campaign in North America. In 2006, he founded the mobile committee for the Interactive Advertising Bureau (IAB) in New York City. In 2007, Schwartz established a joint task force between the Mobile Marketing Association (MMA) and the IAB with the aid of the Media Rating Council (MRC) to develop global, auditable mobile measurement standards.

In 2012, Schwartz was re-elected for his third term as the Chair of the Mobile Entertainment Forum North America and served as a member of the Mobile Entertainment Forum Global Board out of London, United Kingdom. Schwartz worked with Mobile Entertainment Forum to established a partnership between the Accredited Standards Committee ASC X9 to develop m-commerce security standards in the United States.

Schwartz worked with the Canadian Radio-television and Telecommunications Commission and Dell to launch the first North American implementation of Next Generation 9-1-1 emergency services. The Next Generation 9-1-1 mobile messaging service launched in early 2014. These essential services included non-emergency mobile messaging services at a municipal level.

In 2017, Impact Mobile was acquired by Cisco. Schwartz is presently founder and President of the Canadian Lenders Association and global director of the Location Based Marketing Association promoting standards across mobile devices.

Schwartz is an alumnus of Columbia University and Stanford University Center in Japan.
