= Gary Knight =

Gary Knight may refer to:

- Gary Knight (photographer), British photographer and photojournalist
- Gary Knight, American singer and songwriter, one half of the 1960s duo Dey and Knight
- Gary Knight (cricketer) (born 1950), former Australian cricketer
- Gary Knight (rugby union) (born 1951), former New Zealand rugby union player
