= Gary Hart (disambiguation) =

Gary Hart (born 1936) is an American politician.

Gary Hart or Garry Hart may also refer to:

- Gary Hart (footballer) (born 1976), British footballer
- Gary Hart (wrestler) (1942–2008), American professional wrestler and wrestling manager
- Gary K. Hart (1943–2022), American politician
- Gary Hart, British citizen who caused the Great Heck rail crash by falling asleep while driving on the M62 motorway
- Garry Hart, Baron Hart of Chilton (1940–2017), British Labour politician
