= Glenn McCarthy =

American oil tycoon (1907–1988)

- Born: Glenn Herbert McCarthy; December 25, 1907; Beaumont, Texas, U.S.
- Died: December 26, 1988 (aged 81); Houston, Texas, U.S.
- Education: Texas A&M University, Rice University
- Occupation: Entrepreneur

Glenn Herbert McCarthy (December 25, 1907 – December 26, 1988) was an American oil tycoon. The media often referred to him as "Diamond Glenn" and "The King of the Wildcatters". McCarthy was an oil prospector and entrepreneur who owned many businesses in various sectors of the economy. McCarthy founded the Shamrock Hotel in Houston, which garnered him national fame and inspired the fictional character Jett Rink in Edna Ferber's 1952 novel Giant which, in 1956, became a film, which starred James Dean in the role.

== Early life ==
McCarthy was born on December 25, 1907, in Beaumont, Texas, almost seven years after the discovery of oil at Spindletop. His father, Will McCarthy, worked in the oil fields and from the age of eight, the younger McCarthy served the roughnecks as a waterboy for 50 cents per day. During an oil drilling boom near Houston, Texas, the family moved to the city where his father gained employment. When he was 17, McCarthy enlisted in the U.S. Navy and returned to San Jacinto High School. He attended Tulane University on a football scholarship but injured his leg. He later attended Texas A&M University and Rice University, then dropped out of college and ventured into business. When he was 23, McCarthy married 16-year-old Faustine Lee, whose father William Lee was a partner in Yount-Lee Oil Company. McCarthy later claimed he had less than $1.50 to his name when he got married.

== Oil ==
He talked his father and brother into working with him drilling for oil in Hardin County, Texas. The first attempt failed, but two years later, he made another attempt farther south near Anahuac, Texas and succeeded. Between 1931 and 1942, he struck oil 38 times. In 1941, McCarthy bought land where the future Astrodome was built along with 4,800 acres (19 km^{2}) of what is now Sharpstown, Texas. During the 1940s, he established 11 oilfields and expanded several others.

== Fame and notoriety ==
"Diamond Glenn" drew much attention from the national media due to his charismatic personality and his rags-to-riches story. Both loved and scorned by the media, his image formed the cultural mythos of the Texas oil millionaire: a charming, lucky, unabashed businessman. In 1949, McCarthy built the luxurious Shamrock Hotel in Houston, spending $21 million for its construction. He then held what has been cited as "Houston's biggest party" for the hotel's grand opening. Dozens of Hollywood celebrities, many of whom were flown into Houston Municipal Airport on a Boeing 307 Stratoliner airplane which he had acquired from Howard Hughes.

Like most wildcatters, McCarthy was an aggressive investor. His multiple ventures led to a series of financial up and downs. In 1952, a life insurance company acquired the title to the Shamrock Hotel, which was sold to the Hilton Hotels Corporation. McCarthy restructured his business dealings and persisted. His business holdings included KXYZ radio station in Houston, two banks, a bar, a brand of bourbon called "Wildcatter", the McCarthy Chemical Company, a magazine, 14 "throwaway" newspapers and a movie production company known as Glenn McCarthy Productions. He served as chairman of the former Eastern Air Lines and president of the United States Petroleum Association.

== Later life ==
McCarthy avoided publicity during his later career and lived with his wife in the La Porte area near Galveston, Texas. He had four daughters and one son, Glenn Jr. He died on December 26, 1988, aged 81, in Houston.
