= Garry Peters (footballer) =

Australian rules footballer

Personal information
- Full name: Garry Peters
- Born: 13 April 1945 (age 81)
- Height: 188 cm (6 ft 2 in)
- Weight: 74 kg (163 lb)

Playing career^{1}
Years	Club	Games (Goals)
1964–67	Footscray	18 (3)
- ^{1} Playing statistics correct to the end of 1967.

Garry Peters (born 13 April 1945) is a former Australian rules footballer who played with Footscray in the Victorian Football League (VFL).
