= 2009 Molson Scotia Cup =

- Host city: Chester, Nova Scotia
- Arena: Chester Curling Club
- Dates: February 10–15
- Winner: Team Dacey
- Curling club: Mayflower CC, Halifax
- Skip: Mark Dacey
- Third: Bruce Lohnes
- Second: Andrew Gibson
- Lead: Kris Granchelli
- Finalist: Ian Fitzner-Leblanc

The 2009 Molson Scotia Cup (Nova Scotia's men's provincial curling championship) was held February 10-15 at the Chester Curling Club in Chester, Nova Scotia. The winning Mark Dacey team represented Nova Scotia at the 2009 Tim Hortons Brier in Calgary.

== Teams ==
Skip	Vice	Second	Lead	Alternate	Club
Shawn Adams	Paul Flemming	Craig Burgess	Kelly Mittelstadt		Mayflower Curling Club, Halifax
Trevor Archibald	David Lonergan	Peter Lang	Mike McGowan	Mike Larsen	Glooscap Curling Club, Kentville
Mike Bardsley	Dana Seaward	Mark Robar	Steve Ivany		Mayflower Curling Club, Halifax
Peter Burgess	Chuck Patriquin	Todd Burgess	Jared Bent	Bill Gatchell	Truro Curling Club
Andrew Corkum	Peter Eddy*	John Desrosiers	Alan Cameron		Mayflower Curling Club, Halifax
Mark Dacey	Bruce Lohnes	Andrew Gibson	Kris Granchelli		Mayflower Curling Club, Halifax
Ian Fitzner-LeBlanc	Stuart MacLean	Kent Smith	Philip Crowell		Brookfield Curling Club
Rob Harris	Justin Grundy	Mat Harris	Harold McCarthy		Mayflower Curling Club, Halifax
Mark Kehoe	Tom Sullivan	Scott Saccary	Kevin Saccary	Donnie Smith	Mayflower Curling Club, Halifax
Brent MacDougall	Kevin Lonergan	Chris Emeneau	Jeremiah Anderson		Mayflower Curling Club, Halifax
Doug MacKenzie	Mike Flemming	Jordon Pinder	Kyle Schmeisser		Mayflower Curling Club, Halifax
Glen MacLeod	Chris Sutherland	Doug Bryant	Kevin Ouellette		Mayflower Curling Club, Halifax
Jamie Murphy	Jon Wamback	Brad McInnis	Jared Bowles	Luke Johnson	Mayflower Curling Club, Halifax
Ken Myers	Alan Oleary	Jim Walsh	David Delahunt		Mayflower Curling Club, Halifax
Brian Rafuse	Curt Palmer	Alan Darragh	Dave Slauenwhite	Glenn Josephson	Bridgewater Curling Club
Chad Stevens	Graham Breckon	Jeff Mordeen	Jose Teixeira		Chester Curling Club

* Throws skip rocks

== Draw Brackets ==
=== A Event ===
Round of 16
Brian Rafuse	7
Trevor Archibald	5
Ian Fitzner-Leblanc	7
Chad Stevens	6
Doug MacKenzie	8
Andrew Corkum	3
Glen MacLeod	4
Jamie Murphy	7
Mark Kehoe	9
Peter Burgess	3
Mark Dacey	8
Mike Bardsley	3
Brent MacDougall	7
Rob Harris	8
Shawn Adams	4
Ken Myers	2

Quarter-finals
Brian Rafuse	6
Ian Fitzner-Leblanc	8
Doug MacKenzie	5
Jamie Murphy	4
Mark Kehoe	9
Mark Dacey	12
Rob Harris	2
Shawn Adams	8

Semi-finals
Ian Fitzner-Leblanc	3
Doug MacKenzie	7
Mark Dacey	9
Shawn Adams	8

A Qualifier Match
Doug MacKenzie	6
Mark Dacey	7

=== B Event ===
Round of 16
Andrew Corkum	6
Glen MacLeod	10
Peter Burgess	8
Mike Bardsley	4

Quarterfinals
Brian Rafuse	4
Glen MacLeod	9
Rob Harris	7
Peter Burgess	10

Semifinals
Shawn Adams	1
Glen MacLeod	8
Ian Fitzner-Leblanc	6
Peter Burgess	5

Finals
Glen MacLeod	4
Ian Fitzner-Leblanc	7
B Qualifier Match
Ian Fitzner-Leblanc	8
Doug MacKenzie	2

Round of 16
Trevor Archibald	2
Chad Stevens	7
Brent MacDougall	3
Ken Myers	9

Quarterfinals
Jamie Murphy	2
Chad Stevens	8
Mark Kehoe	5
Ken Myers	9

Semifinals
Chad Stevens	6
Ken Myers	8

Finals
Doug MacKenzie	9
Ken Myers	7

=== C Event ===
Quarterfinals
Brian Rafuse	8
Rob Harris	5
Jamie Murphy	6
Mark Kehoe	9

Semifinals
Ken Myers	7
Brian Rafuse	4
Glen MacLeod	7
Mark Kehoe	9

C Qualifier Match
Ken Myers	8
Mark Kehoe	2

Round of 16
Andrew Corkum	7
Trevor Archibald	6
Mike Bardsley	8
Brent MacDougall	7

Quarterfinals
Andrew Corkum	4
Mike Bardsley	9

Semifinals
Peter Burgess	2
Shawn Adams	6
Chad Stevens	8
Mike Bardsley	7

Finals
Shawn Adams	6
Chad Stevens	4
C Qualifier Match
Shawn Adams	2
Doug MacKenzie	9

== Results ==
=== Draw 1 ===
February 11, 1000

Sheet 1	1	2	3	4	5	6	7	8	9	10	Final
Brian Rafuse	1	0	1	1	0	1	0	2	0	1	7
Trevor Archibald	0	2	0	0	1	0	1	0	1	0	5

Sheet 2	1	2	3	4	5	6	7	8	9	10	Final
Ian Fitzner-Leblanc	1	0	1	0	2	0	2	1	0	X	7
Chad Stevens	0	1	0	1	0	2	0	0	2	X	6

Sheet 3	1	2	3	4	5	6	7	8	9	10	Final
Andrew Corkum	0	0	2	1	0	0	0	0	X	X	3
Doug MacKenzie	1	4	0	0	0	1	1	1	X	X	8

Sheet 4	1	2	3	4	5	6	7	8	9	10	Final
Jamie Murphy	0	2	0	2	0	1	1	1	1	X	8
Glen MacLeod	1	0	1	0	2	0	0	0	0	X	4

=== Draw 2 ===
February 11, 1500

Sheet 1	1	2	3	4	5	6	7	8	9	10	Final
Mark Kehoe	1	1	0	2	0	0	2	3	X	X	9
Peter Burgess	0	0	1	0	0	2	0	0	X	X	3

Sheet 2	1	2	3	4	5	6	7	8	9	10	Final
Mark Dacey	2	0	1	0	3	2	0	X	X	X	8
Mike Bardsley	0	1	0	1	0	0	1	X	X	X	3

Sheet 3	1	2	3	4	5	6	7	8	9	10	11	Final
Rob Harris	0	0	0	1	1	0	4	0	1	0	1	8
Brent MacDougall	0	0	0	0	0	2	0	2	0	3	0	7

Sheet 4	1	2	3	4	5	6	7	8	9	10	Final
Shawn Adams	1	0	0	2	0	0	0	0	1	X	4
Ken Myers	0	1	1	0	0	0	0	0	0	X	2

=== Draw 3 ===
February 12, 0830

Sheet 1	1	2	3	4	5	6	7	8	9	10	Final
Doug MacKenzie	1	0	1	0	1	1	0	1	0	X	5
Jamie Murphy	0	1	0	1	0	0	1	0	1	X	4

Sheet 2	1	2	3	4	5	6	7	8	9	10	Final
Glen MacLeod	2	0	0	1	2	0	2	0	3	X	10
Andrew Corkum	0	0	3	0	0	2	0	1	0	X	6

Sheet 3	1	2	3	4	5	6	7	8	9	10	Final
Trevor Archibald	1	0	0	0	1	X	X	X	X	X	2
Chad Stevens	0	3	3	1	0	X	X	X	X	X	7

Sheet 4	1	2	3	4	5	6	7	8	9	10	Final
Ian Fitzner-Leblanc	0	2	0	2	0	1	3	0	0	0	8
Brian Rafuse	1	0	1	0	1	0	0	2	0	1	6

=== Draw 4 ===
February 12, 1230

Sheet 1	1	2	3	4	5	6	7	8	9	10	Final
Shawn Adams	3	2	3	0	0	X	X	X	X	X	8
Rob Harris	0	0	0	2	0	X	X	X	X	X	2

Sheet 2	1	2	3	4	5	6	7	8	9	10	Final
Ken Myers	0	0	3	2	2	1	1	X	X	X	9
Brent MacDougall	2	1	0	0	0	0	0	X	X	X	3

Sheet 3	1	2	3	4	5	6	7	8	9	10	Final
Peter Burgess	2	0	0	2	0	1	0	2	1	X	8
Mike Bardsley	0	1	0	0	2	0	1	0	0	X	4

Sheet 4	1	2	3	4	5	6	7	8	9	10	11	Final
Mark Dacey	0	2	0	2	1	0	2	1	1	0	3	12
Mark Kehoe	2	0	3	0	0	1	0	0	0	3	0	9

=== Draw 5 ===
February 12, 1630

Sheet 1	1	2	3	4	5	6	7	8	9	10	11	Final
Andrew Corkum	0	0	0	0	1	0	2	1	2	0	1	7
Trevor Archibald	1	0	1	2	0	1	0	0	0	1	0	6

Sheet 2	1	2	3	4	5	6	7	8	9	10	Final
Ian Fitzner-Leblanc	0	1	0	0	1	0	1	0	0	X	3
Doug MacKenzie	0	0	1	1	0	3	0	0	2	X	7

Sheet 3	1	2	3	4	5	6	7	8	9	10	Final
Glen MacLeod	2	0	0	1	0	3	0	3	X	X	9
Brian Rafuse	0	0	1	0	1	0	2	0	X	X	4

Sheet 4	1	2	3	4	5	6	7	8	9	10	Final
Jamie Murphy	0	0	0	0	1	1	0	0	0	0	2
Chad Stevens	1	2	1	1	0	0	1	2	X	X	8

=== Draw 6 ===
February 12, 2030

Sheet 1	1	2	3	4	5	6	7	8	9	10	Final
Brent MacDougall	0	1	0	0	2	0	3	0	1	0	7
Mike Bardsley	4	0	1	0	0	1	0	1	0	1	8

Sheet 2	1	2	3	4	5	6	7	8	9	10	11	Final
Mark Dacey	2	0	2	0	1	2	0	1	0	0	1	9
Shawn Adams	0	1	0	4	0	0	1	0	1	1	0	8

Sheet 3	1	2	3	4	5	6	7	8	9	10	Final
Ken Myers	0	1	0	2	0	3	2	0	1	X	9
Mark Kehoe	0	0	1	0	3	0	0	1	0	X	5

Sheet 4	1	2	3	4	5	6	7	8	9	10	Final
Rob Harris	0	1	0	2	0	2	1	1	0	X	7
Peter Burgess	3	0	2	0	3	0	0	0	2	X	10

=== Draw 7 ===
February 13, 1000

Sheet 1	1	2	3	4	5	6	7	8	9	10	Final
Mark Kehoe	1	1	0	0	1	1	2	0	2	1	9
Jamie Murphy	0	0	1	3	0	0	0	2	0	0	6

Sheet 2	1	2	3	4	5	6	7	8	9	10	Final
Rob Harris	0	0	0	1	0	3	0	0	1	X	5
Brian Rafuse	0	1	4	0	1	0	0	2	0	X	8

Sheet 3	1	2	3	4	5	6	7	8	9	10	Final
Peter Burgess	0	0	2	1	0	0	0	0	1	1	5
Ian Fitzner-Leblanc	0	1	0	0	2	0	0	3	0	0	6

Sheet 4	1	2	3	4	5	6	7	8	9	10	Final
Glen MacLeod	0	0	1	2	0	5	X	X	X	X	8
Shawn Adams	0	0	0	0	1	0	X	X	X	X	1

=== Draw 8 ===
February 13, 1500

Sheet 1	1	2	3	4	5	6	7	8	9	10	Final
Ken Myers	1	0	0	0	2	0	3	0	0	2	8
Chad Stevens	0	2	0	1	0	2	0	1	0	0	6

Sheet 2	1	2	3	4	5	6	7	8	9	10	Final
Andrew Corkum	0	0	0	1	0	2	0	1	0	X	4
Mike Bardsley	0	1	1	0	2	0	3	0	2	X	9

Sheet 3	1	2	3	4	5	6	7	8	9	10	Final
Doug MacKenzie	0	1	1	1	0	2	0	0	1	0	6
Mark Dacey	1	0	0	0	2	0	2	1	0	1	7

=== Draw 9 ===
February 13, 2000

Sheet 1	1	2	3	4	5	6	7	8	9	10	Final
Peter Burgess	0	0	0	0	1	0	0	1	X	X	2
Shawn Adams	0	0	2	1	0	2	1	0	X	X	6

Sheet 2	1	2	3	4	5	6	7	8	9	10	Final
Glen MacLeod	0	0	1	0	0	1	0	2	0	X	4
Ian Fitzner-Leblanc	1	1	0	0	1	0	2	0	2	X	7

Sheet 3	1	2	3	4	5	6	7	8	9	10	Final
Mike Bardsley	0	2	0	1	0	1	0	2	1	0	7
Chad Stevens	1	0	2	0	1	0	3	0	0	1	8

Sheet 4	1	2	3	4	5	6	7	8	9	10	11	Final
Doug MacKenzie	0	0	0	2	0	1	2	0	2	0	2	9
Ken Myers	0	2	2	0	1	0	0	1	0	1	0	7

=== Draw 10 ===
February 14, 1000

Sheet 1	1	2	3	4	5	6	7	8	9	10	Final
Ken Myers	2	0	1	0	0	1	1	1	0	1	7
Brian Rafuse	0	1	0	1	1	0	0	0	1	0	4

Sheet 2	1	2	3	4	5	6	7	8	9	10	Final
Shawn Adams	0	1	0	1	1	0	0	2	0	1	6
Chad Stevens	1	0	1	0	0	1	0	0	1	0	4

Sheet 3	1	2	3	4	5	6	7	8	9	10	Final
Ian Fitzner-Leblanc	0	3	1	0	3	1	X	X	X	X	8
Doug MacKenzie	0	0	0	2	0	0	X	X	X	X	2

Sheet 4	1	2	3	4	5	6	7	8	9	10	11	Final
Mark Kehoe	1	0	0	2	0	2	1	0	1	0	2	9
Glen MacLeod	0	1	1	0	2	0	0	1	0	2	0	7

=== Draw 11 ===
February 14, 1500

Sheet 2	1	2	3	4	5	6	7	8	9	10	Final
Mark Kehoe	0	1	0	0	0	1	0	0	X	X	2
Ken Myers	1	0	3	1	1	0	0	2	X	X	8

Sheet 4	1	2	3	4	5	6	7	8	9	10	Final
Doug MacKenzie	0	2	2	3	0	0	2	X	X	X	9
Shawn Adams	0	0	0	0	1	1	0	X	X	X	2

== Playoffs ==
Page playoff system
A	Mark Dacey	8
B	Ian Fitzner-Leblanc	1
C1	Ken Myers	2
C2	Doug MacKenzie	6

Semifinal
B	Ian Fitzner-Leblanc	7
C2	Doug MacKenzie	6

Final
A	Mark Dacey	8
B	Ian Fitzner-Leblanc	1

=== A vs. B ===
February 14, 2000

Sheet 2	1	2	3	4	5	6	7	8	9	10	Final
Mark Dacey	3	3	0	2	X	X	X	X	X	X	8
Ian Fitzner-Leblanc	0	0	1	0	X	X	X	X	X	X	1

=== C1 vs. C2 ===
February 14, 2000

Sheet 3	1	2	3	4	5	6	7	8	9	10	Final
Ken Myers	0	1	0	0	0	0	0	1	0	X	2
Doug MacKenzie	0	0	2	1	0	1	1	0	1	X	6

=== Semifinal ===
February 15, 1000

Sheet 2	1	2	3	4	5	6	7	8	9	10	Final
Ian Fitzner-Leblanc	2	2	0	1	1	0	0	1	0	X	7
Doug MacKenzie	0	0	2	0	0	1	1	0	2	X	6

=== Final ===
February 15, 1500

Sheet 2	1	2	3	4	5	6	7	8	9	10	Final
Mark Dacey	3	0	2	1	2	X	X	X	X	X	8
Ian Fitzner-Leblanc	0	1	0	0	0	X	X	X	X	X	1
