= Gary Stewart =

Gary Stewart may refer to:

- Gary Stewart (singer) (1944–2003), American country musician
- Gary L. Stewart (born 1953), Imperator of AMORC from 1987 to 1990
- Gary Stewart (politician) (born 1938), politician in Ontario, Canada
- Gary Stewart (basketball) (born 1961), American college basketball coach
- Gary Loyd Stewart, American author, engineer, and businessman
- Gary Stewart, protagonist in The House of the Dead 2
- Gary Stewart (music executive) (1957–2019), American music executive

== See also ==
- Garry Stewart (born 1962), artistic director of the Australian Dance Theater
- Gareth Stewart (born 1980), English footballer
