= Gary Davis =

Gary Davis may refer to:

- Gary Davis (American football) (born 1954), American football player
- Reverend Gary Davis (1896–1972), American singer
- Gary Lee Davis (1944–1997), American convicted murderer
- Garry Davis (1921–2013), American peace activist
- Garry Davis (boxer) (born 1947), Bahamian boxer
- Gary "Litefoot" Davis (born 1969), American businessman and actor
- Gary Davis, founder of Davis Motorcar Company

== See also ==
- Gary Davies (disambiguation)
- Gray Davis (born 1942), former governor of California
