= Gary Moore (footballer, born 1968) =

English footballer

Personal information
- Date of birth: 29 December 1968 (age 57)
- Place of birth: Greenwich, England
- Position: Forward

Senior career*
Years	Team	Apps	(Gls)
- Alma Swanley
1990–1991	Maidstone United	5	(1)
- Margate
- * Club domestic league appearances and goals

Gary Moore (born 29 December 1968) is an English footballer who played in The Football League for Maidstone United.
