= Gerald =

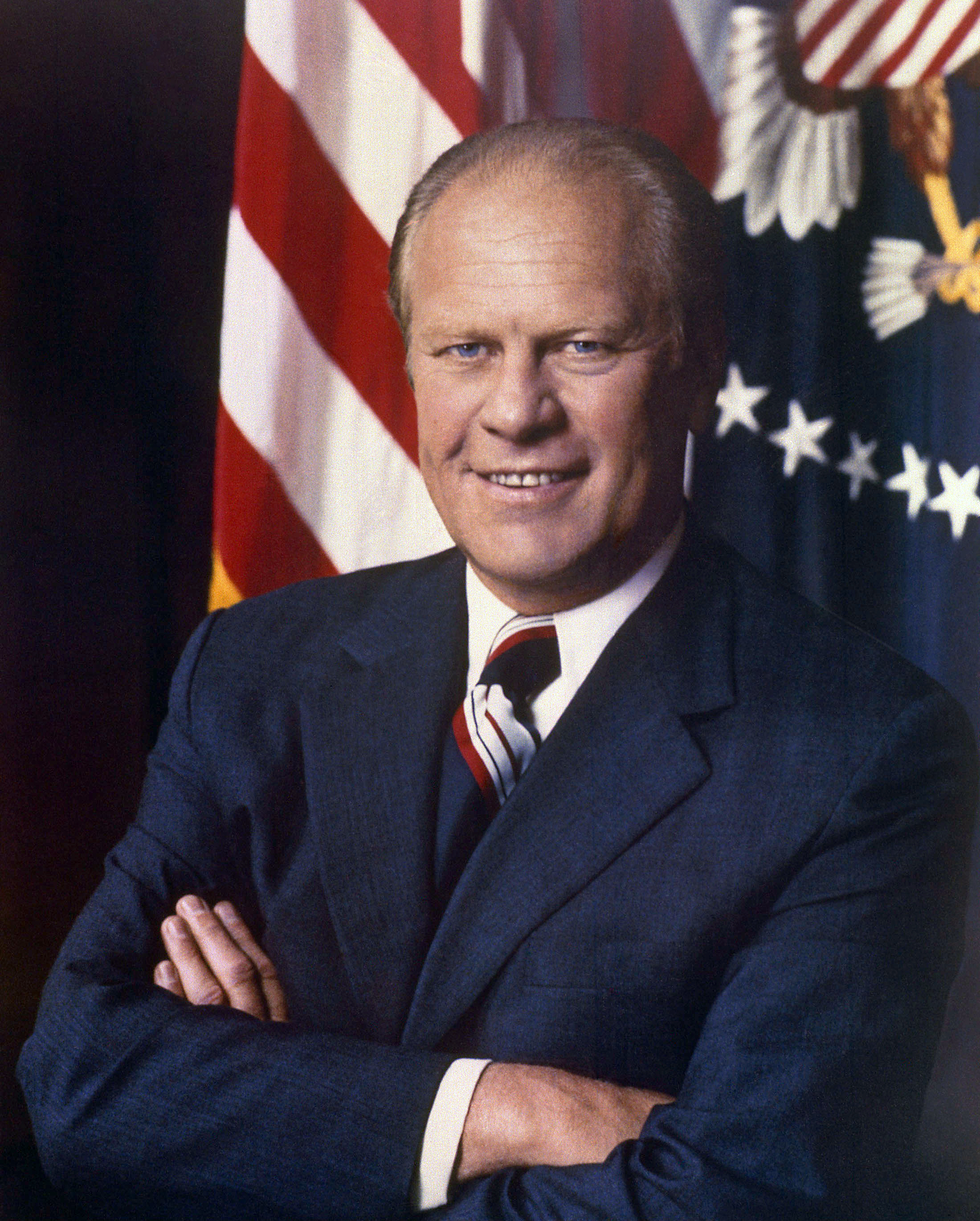
- Gerald Ford's official portrait
- Pronunciation: /ˈdʒɛrəld/ JERR-əld
- Gender: Male

Origin
- Meaning: "rule of the spear", "bright spear"
- Region of origin: Germanic

Other names
- Related names: Jerrold, Geraldine, Jerald, Gerard, Jerry, Gerry, Gerhard, Geert

Gerald is a masculine given name derived from the Germanic languages prefix ger- ("spear") and suffix -wald ("rule"). Gerald is a Norman French variant of the Germanic name. An Old English equivalent name was Garweald, the likely original name of Gerald of Mayo, a British Roman Catholic monk who established a monastery in Mayo, Ireland in 670. Nearly two centuries later, Gerald of Aurillac, a French count, took a vow of celibacy and later became known as the Roman Catholic patron saint of bachelors. The name was in regular use during the Middle Ages but declined after 1300 in England. It remained a common name in Ireland, where it was a common name among the powerful FitzGerald dynasty. The name was revived in the Anglosphere in the 19th century by writers of historical novels along with other names that had been popular in the medieval era. British novelist Ann Hatton published a novel called Gerald Fitzgerald in 1831. Author Dorothea Grubb published her novel Gerald Fitzgerald in 1845, and Irish author Charles Lever published his novel, also entitled Gerald Fitzgerald, in 1859. The name had strong associations with Ireland in English-speaking countries. In the United States, it increased in use for boys after 1910 and peaked in use in 1939, when it was the 19th most popular name given to American boys. Jerry is the usual short form of the name. Variants include the English given name Jerrold, the feminine nickname Jeri and the Welsh language Gerallt and Irish language Gearalt. Gerald is less common as a surname. The name is also found in French as Gérald. Geraldine is the feminine equivalent.

== Given name ==
People with the name Gerald include:

=== Entertainers ===
- Gerald Anderson (born 1989), Filipino-American actor
- Gerald Butler (writer) (1907–1988), English writer and screenwriter
- Gerald Casale (born 1948), vocalist, bass guitar & synthesizer player, Devo
- Gerry Cinnamon (born Gerald Crosbie, 1984), Scottish musician
- Gerald Finzi (1901–1956), British composer
- Gerald Fried (1928–2023), American composer
- Gerald Gillum (born 1989), American rapper known as "G-Eazy"
- Gerald Harper (born 1931), English actor
- Gerald Haslam (1937–2021), American author The Other California
- Gerald Alexander Held (born 1958), German actor
- Gerald Levert (1966–2006), American R&B singer and songwriter
- Gerald Masters (1955–2007), songwriter and musician
- Gerald McRaney (born 1947), American actor
- Gérald Neveu (1921–1960), French poet
- Gerald Santos (born 1991), Filipino actor and singer
- Gerald Rydel Simpson (born 1967), British record producer and musician, better known as A Guy Called Gerald
- Gerald Lee Smith (born 1983), American rapper known as "Nekro G"
- Jerry Stiller (1927–2020), American actor and comedian, and the father of Ben Stiller
- Gerald Vizenor (born 1934), novelist, poet, and critic
- Gerald Wiley, a pseudonym used by British comic actor and writer Ronnie Barker (1929–2005)

=== Politicians ===
- Gerald Boland (1885–1973), Ireland's longest-serving Minister for Justice
- Gerald Crosier (1933–2016), American politician
- Gerald Ford (1913–2006), 38th President of the United States
- Gerald Gardiner, Baron Gardiner (1900–1990), Lord Chancellor from 1964 to 1970
- Gerald Häfner (born 1956), German MEP
- Gerald Klug (born 1968), Austrian politician
- Gerald Nabarro (1913–1973), British Conservative politician
- Gerald S. McGowan (born 1946), US Ambassador to Portugal
- Gerald Van Woerkom (born 1947), American politician
- Gerald Willis (politician) (1940–2015), American businessman and politician
- Gerald "Boomer" Wright, American politician
- Gerald Wellesley, 7th Duke of Wellington (1885–1972), British diplomat, soldier, and architect
- Gerald Michael Gabbard (born 1948), also known as Mike Gabbard

=== Sportspeople ===
- Gerald Asamoah (born 1978), Ghanaian-born German football player
- Gerald Beverly (born 1993), American basketball player
- Gerald Brown (American football) (born 1959), American football coach
- Gerald Christian (born 1991), American football player
- Gerald Davies (born 1945), Welsh rugby player
- Gerald Dockery (born 1970), American football player
- Gerald Everett (born 1994), American football player
- Gerald Green (born 1986), American basketball player
- Gerald "Dusty" Hannahs (born 1993), American basketball player in the Israeli Basketball Premier League
- Gerald Humphries (1908–1983), English cricketer
- Gerald Laird (born 1979), American baseball player
- Gerald Madkins (born 1969), American basketball player and executive
- Gerald Melzer (born 1990), Austrian tennis player
- Gerald Sensabaugh (born 1983), American football player
- Gerald Sherry, American football player
- Gerald Tabios (born 1969), Filipino long-distance runner
- Gerald Wallace (born 1982), American basketball player
- Gerald Willis (born 1995), American football player

=== Other fields ===
- Gerald Ash (born 1942), electrical engineer
- Gerald Birks (1894–1991), Canadian World War I fighter ace
- Gerald Bull (1929–1990), Canadian aerospace/artillery engineer
- Gerald Burchard (1911–1931; also known as Jerry), American photographer, educator
- Giraldus Cambrensis (Gerald of Wales), medieval clergyman and chronicler of his times
- Gerald Cohen (1941–2009), Canadian professor of social and political theory at Oxford University, known as G. A. Cohen
- Gerald Cooper British farmer and tv personality featuring on Clarkson's Farm
- Gerald Durrell (1925–1995), British naturalist, zookeeper, conservationist, author, and television presenter
- Lady Gerald Fitzalan-Howard, British aristocrat
- Gerald C. Kelleher (1908–2003), American military officer
- Gerald Murphy, American heir
- Gerald Ratner (born 1949), British retail tycoon
- Gerald Ratner (lawyer) (1913–2014), lawyer in Chicago
- Gerald Mayo, filed a lawsuit against Satan and his servants in US District Court
- Gerald Shur (1933–2020), American lawyer, and the founder of the US Federal Witness Protection Program
- Gerald Sparrow (1903–1988), British lawyer, judge and travel writer
- Gerald Templer (1898–1979), British Army officer and military commander
- Gerald C. Thomas (1894–1984), United States Marine Corpsgeneral who served as Assistant Commandant of the Marine Corps
- Gerald Zamponi, Canadian academic

=== Disambiguation pages ===
- Gerald Brown (disambiguation)
- Gerald Butler (disambiguation)
- Gerald Davis (disambiguation)
- Gerald Ford (disambiguation)
- Gerald Green (disambiguation)
- Gerald Lascelles (disambiguation)
- Gerald Thomas (disambiguation)

=== Fictional characters ===
- Gerald Tippett, a character in the New Zealand soap opera Shortland Street
- Gerald Robotnik, a character from Sonic Adventure 2
- Gerald Broflovski, Kyle Broflovski's father from South Park
- Gerald Martin Johanssen, a character from Nickelodeon's Hey Arnold!
- Gerald, a California sea lion in the 2016 film Finding Dory

== See also ==
- Geraldine
- Gerad (disambiguation)
- Jerald (name)
- Jerrold
- FitzGerald
