= Jerald =

- Pronunciation: /ˈdʒɛrəld/ JERR-əld
- Gender: Male

Origin
- Meaning: "rule of the spear"
- Region of origin: Germanic

Other names
- Related names: Gerald, Jerold, Jerrold, Jeral

Jerald is a masculine given name which is a variant of Gerald, a German name meaning "rule of the spear". Gerald was brought to Great Britain by the Normans, along with variants Jerold and Jerrold, and the feminine Geraldine. Short forms include Jerry and Jere. Jerald is uncommon as a surname.

Notable people with the name Jerald include:

== Given name ==
- Jerald Brown (born 1980), Canadian football player
- Jerald Clark (born 1963), American baseball player
- Jerald Daemyon, American jazz musician
- Jerald Ericksen (1924–2021), American mathematician
- Jerald G. Fishman (1945–2013), American electrical engineer and businessman
- Jerald B. Harkness (1940–2021), American basketball player
- Jerald Hawkins (born 1993), American football player
- Jerald Honeycutt (born 1974), American professional basketball player
- Jerald Ingram (born 1960), American football coach
- J. C. Jackson (born 1995), American football player
- Jerald Johnson (born 1927), minister and emeritus general superintendent in the Church of the Nazarene
- David Jerald Lawson (1930–2007), American Methodist Pastor and University Campus Minister
- Jerald T. Milanich, American anthropologist and archaeologist specializing in Native American culture in Florida
- Jerald Moore (born 1974), American football player
- Jerald Napoles (born 1983), Filipino actor and comedian
- Lorenzo Jerald Patterson (born 1969), American rapper, member of the group N.W.A.
- Jerald Paul (born 1966), Principal Deputy Administrator of the National Nuclear Security Administration at the U.S. Department of Energy
- Jerald Posman, Vice President for Administration and Finance at the City College of New York
- Jerald Raymond, American politician
- Jerald D. Slack (born 1936), retired Major General in the United States Air National Guard
- Jerald Sowell (born 1974), American Football fullback
- Jerald Tanner (1938–2006), American writer about The Church of Jesus Christ of Latter-day Saints
- Jerald terHorst (1922–2010), American journalist and politician

== Surname ==
- Penny Johnson Jerald (born 1961), American actress with an extensive career in film and television

== See also ==
- Gerald (given name)
- Jeral
- Jerold
- Jerrold
