= Jerrold =

- Pronunciation: /ˈdʒɛrəld/ JERR-əld
- Gender: Male

Origin
- Meaning: "rule of the spear"

Other names
- Related names: Gerald, Jerald (see Nicknames and Variations)

Jerrold or Jerold are masculine English given name variants of Gerald, a German language name meaning "rule of the spear" from the prefix ger- ("spear") and suffix -wald ("rule"). Jerrold was initially brought to Great Britain by the Normans. There are feminine nicknames, including Jeri. Jerrold is uncommon as a surname, although it was popular in the 11th and 12th century when biblical names were in style. People with the name Jerrold or its variants include:

== Given name ==
- Jerold T. Hevener (1873–1947), American film actor and director
- Jerrold Immel (born 1936), American television music composer
- Jerrold E. Lomax (1927–2014), American architect
- Jerrold Northrop Moore (1934–2024), American-born British musicologist
- Jerrold Nadler (born 1947), American politician from New York
- Jerrold Orne (1911–2008), American librarian
- Jerold Ottley (1934–2021), American music director and choral conductor
- Jerrold Laurence Samuels, creator of hit novelty record "They're Coming to Take Me Away, Ha-Haaa!" under the alias Napoleon XIV
- Jerrold Zar (1941–2026), American biologist and academic

== Surname ==
- Douglas Francis Jerrold (1893–1964), British journalist and publisher
- Douglas William Jerrold (1803–1857), English dramatist and writer
- Ianthe Jerrold (1898–1977), English novelist
- Mary Jerrold (1877–1955), English actress
- Reginald Jerrold-Nathan (1889–1979), Australian painter
- William Blanchard Jerrold (1826–1884), English journalist and author
- Walter Jerrold (1865–1929), English writer and journalist

Variant

- David Gerrold, science fiction author, born Jerrold David Friedman

== Nicknames and variations ==
Nicknames of the given name Jerrold, and variations of the name (including female variations) include:

- Jeri
- Gerald/Gerrald
- Geraldine
- Jerald
- Jerry
- Jeremiah
- Jere
- Jeremy
- Jery
- Jerrie/Gerrie
- Gerri
- Garrie/Gari
- Other related names: Gerie, Gerry, Ghary, Jarrie, Gharry, Garri, Gerie Garratt, Gerhard, Garred, Jarrelt, Gheraldi, Gerardi, Giraudot, Giradot, Gilardengo, Gerrelts, Jerard, Gerard, Gerhart, Jarett, Jarell, Jarret, Garrett

== History ==
The roots of Jerrold began in the pre-7th-century, of German and French origin. See the top page for more details. However, the name Jerrold is a name more commonly connected with the Dark Ages. The name and variations of Jerrold were first put on record in 1230 for a man named John Gerard in the small village of Pipe Rolls in the county of Somerset, England. The name's popularity started in the late 11th century and reached its peak in the mid-12th century, under the rule of Henry III because of its biblical and violent sense. Other early Jerrold's include:

- Henry Jerard of Essex, England, 1284
- Burkhart Gerhart of Heilbronn, Germany, 1293

Since then, its given name has had reasonable popularity and its surname has been uncommon.

== See also ==
- Jerald (name)
- Gerald (given name)
- Jerrold Electronics
