= Chicago Maroons =

College sports team

- University: University of Chicago
- Nickname: Maroons
- NCAA: Division III
- Conference: University Athletic Association; Midwest Conference (football); CCIW (women's lacrosse)
- Athletic director: Angie Torain
- Location: Chicago, Illinois, U.S.
- Football stadium: Stagg Field
- Basketball arena: Ratner Athletics Center
- Other venues: Henry Crown Fieldhouse
- Colors: Maroon and white
- Mascot: Phil the Phoenix
- Fight song: Wave the Flag
- Website: athletics.uchicago.edu
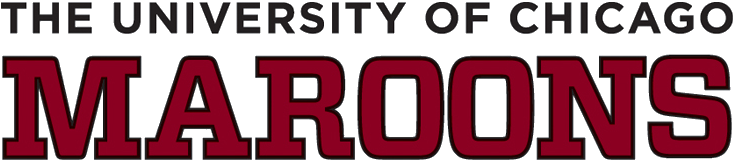

The Chicago Maroons are the intercollegiate sports teams of the University of Chicago. They are named after the color maroon. Team colors are maroon and gray, and Phil the Phoenix is their mascot. They now compete in the NCAA Division III, mostly as members of the University Athletic Association.

The University of Chicago helped found the Big Ten Conference in 1895; although it dropped football in 1939 (as inconsistent with its academic vision), its other teams remained members until 1946. Football returned as a club sport in 1963, as a varsity sport in 1969, and began competing independently in Division III in 1973. The school was part of the Midwest Collegiate Athletic Conference from 1976 to 1987, and its football team joined the Midwest Collegiate Athletic Conference's successor, the Midwest Conference (MWC), in 2017. In the 2018–19 school year, Chicago added baseball to its MWC membership, and elevated its club team in women's lacrosse to full varsity status, with that sport competing in the College Conference of Illinois and Wisconsin (CCIW). The baseball team rejoined the University Athletic Association for the 2025 season.

Stagg Field is the home stadium for the re-instated football team.

== Conference affiliation ==
=== Big Ten Conference ===
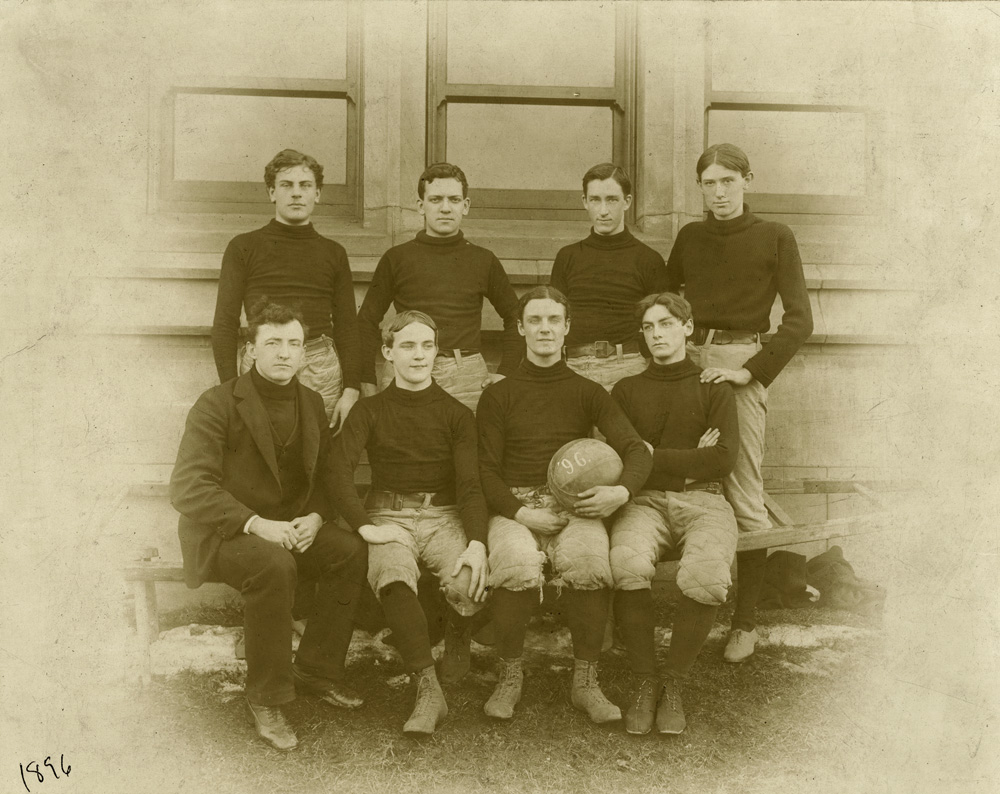
Chicago basketball team of 1895–96

The Maroons helped establish the Big Ten Conference (then known as the "Intercollegiate Conference of Faculty Representatives", and commonly called the "Western Conference") at a follow-up meeting on February 8, 1896. The league initially consisted of Chicago, Purdue, Michigan, Wisconsin, Minnesota, Illinois, and Northwestern.

Jay Berwanger was awarded the first Heisman trophy in 1935.

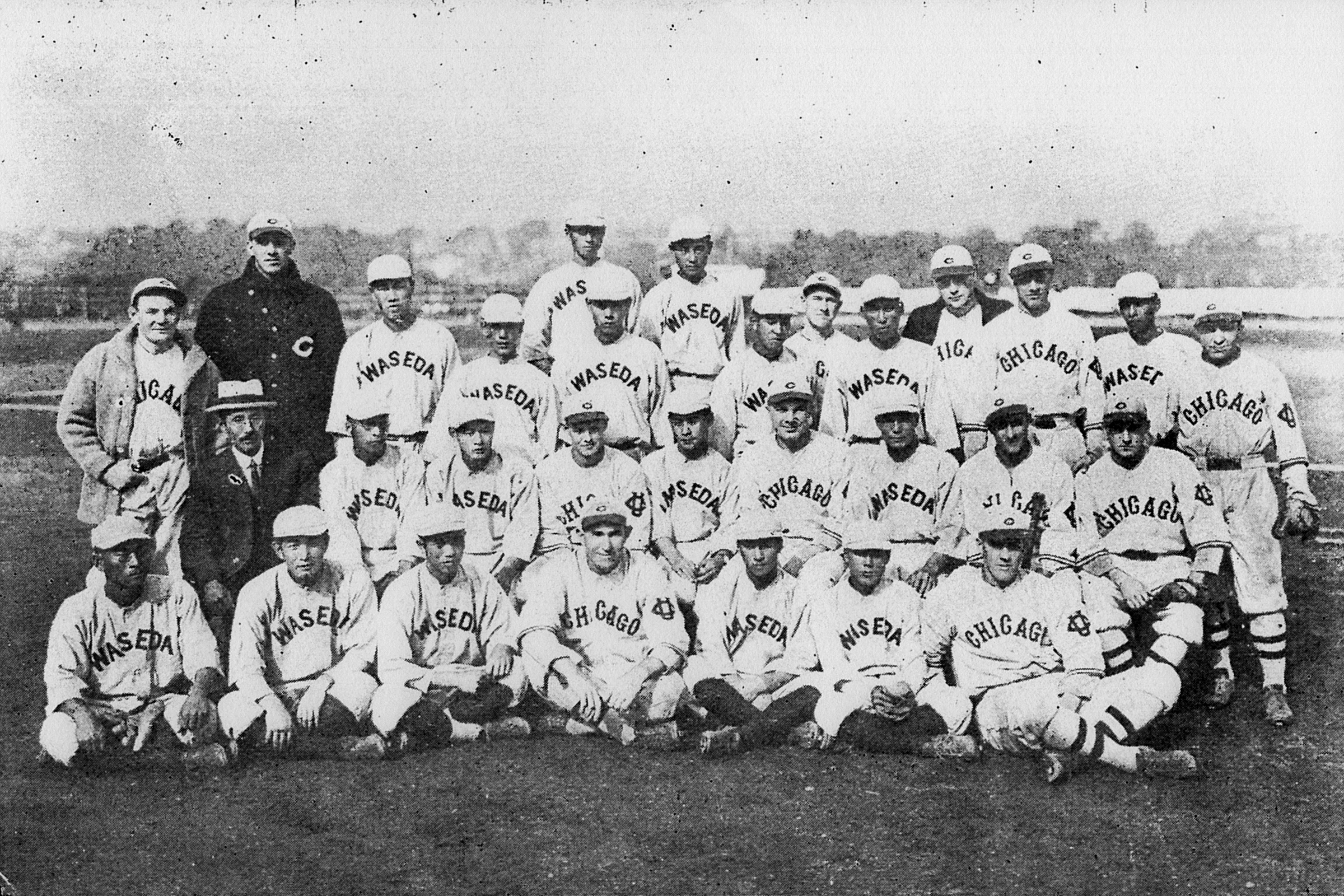
Baseball team of 1915

Hall of Fame coach Amos Alonzo Stagg coached the football team from 1892 to 1932, the basketball team from 1920 to 1921, and the baseball team from 1893 to 1905 and 1907–1913. He encouraged players to adopt vegetarianism, believing it supported both athleticism and a "gentle and gentlemanly" sportsmanship.

The football team was dropped following the 1939 season. In explaining the reason to drop football, Robert Maynard Hutchins, the university's president, had written acidly in The Saturday Evening Post “In many colleges, it is possible for a boy to win 12 letters without learning how to write one.”

On March 7, 1946, the University of Chicago withdrew from the Big Ten Conference. On May 31, 1946, the resignation was formally accepted by the Big Ten Conference.

== Varsity teams ==
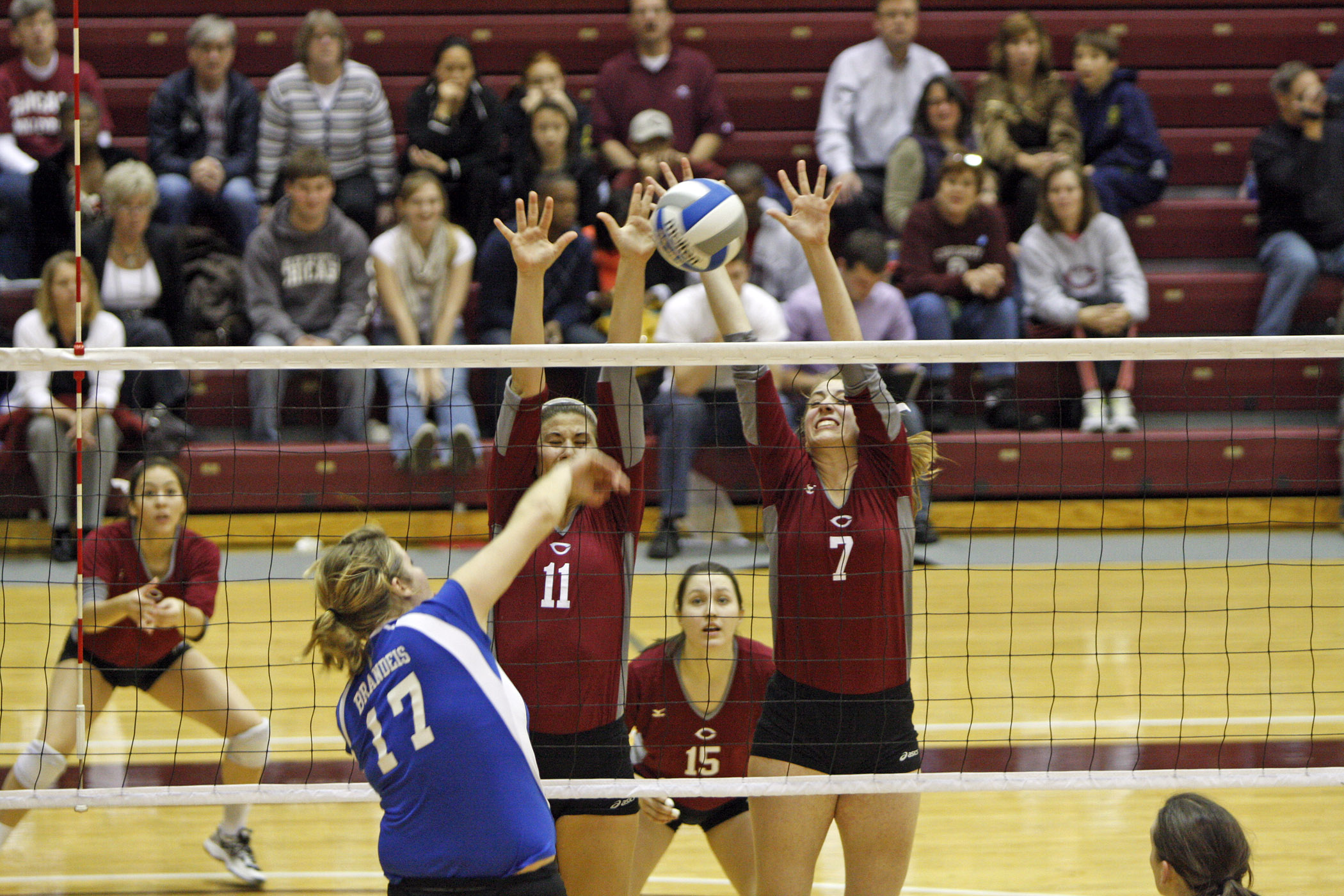
Chicago v Brandeis volleyball in 2011

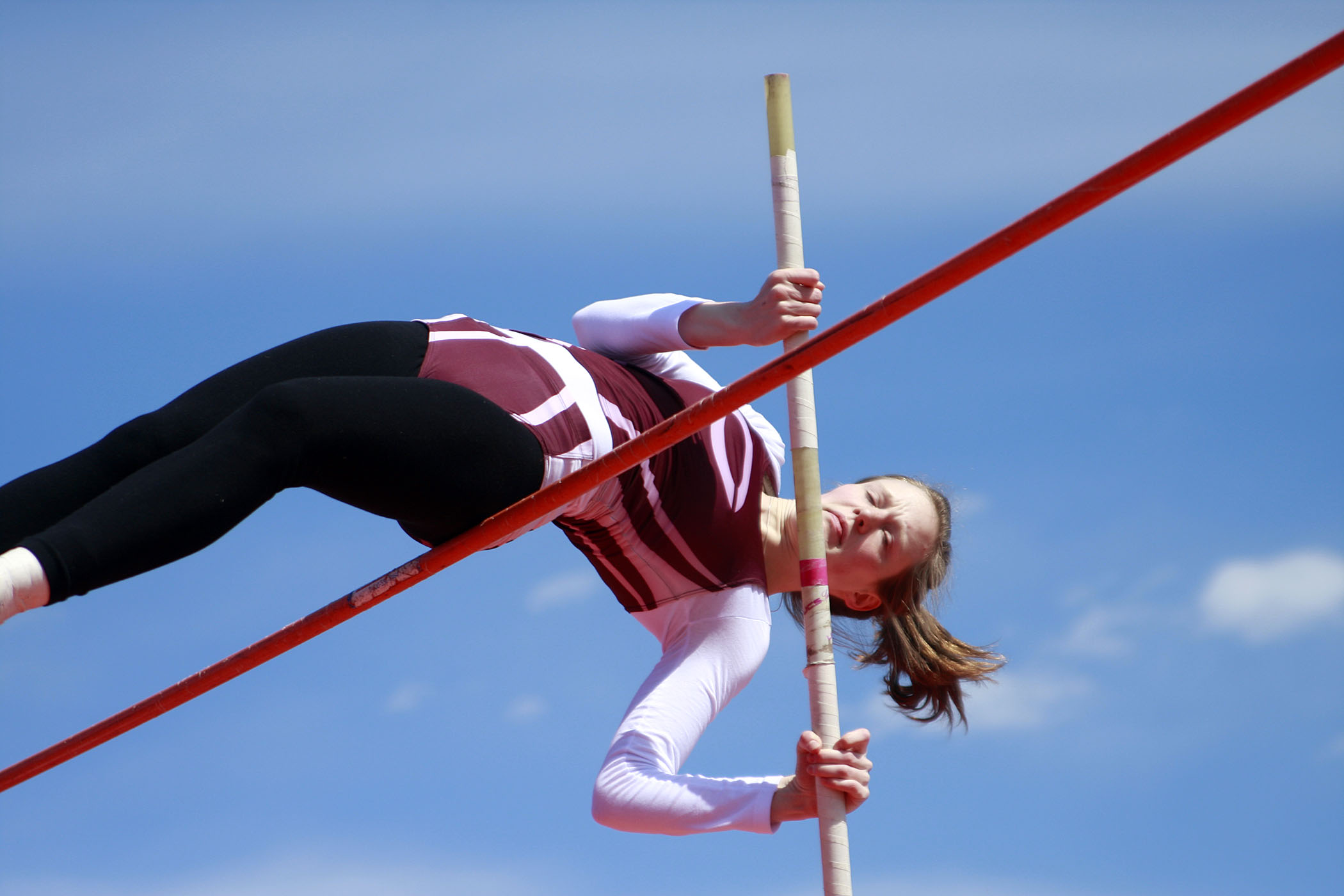
Pole vault

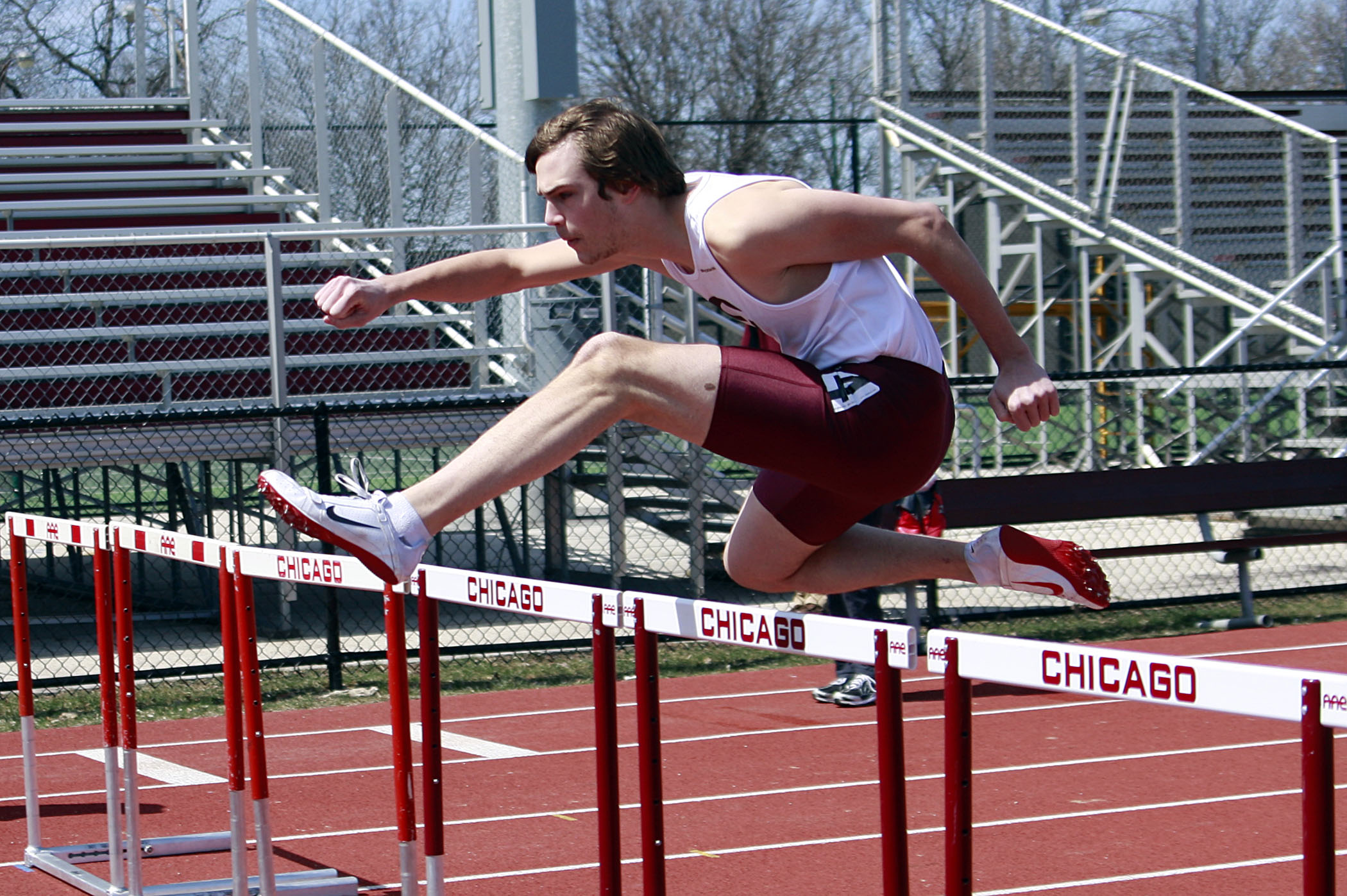
Track athlete

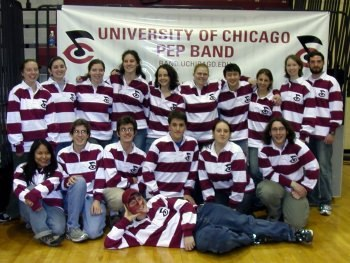
Band

Men's sports	Women's sports
Baseball	Basketball
Basketball	Cross country
Cross country	Lacrosse
Football	Soccer
Golf	Softball
Soccer	Swimming
Swimming	Tennis
Tennis	Track and field
Track and field	Volleyball
Wrestling	

== Facilities ==
=== Current ===
Chicago Maroons Facilities

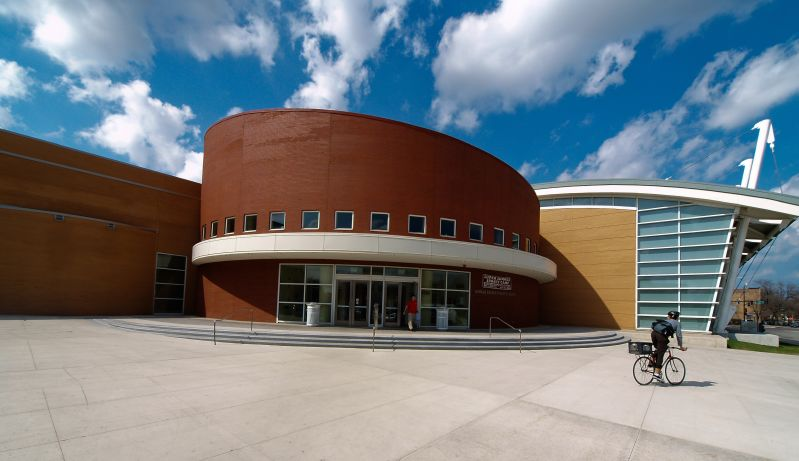
Ratner Athletic Center

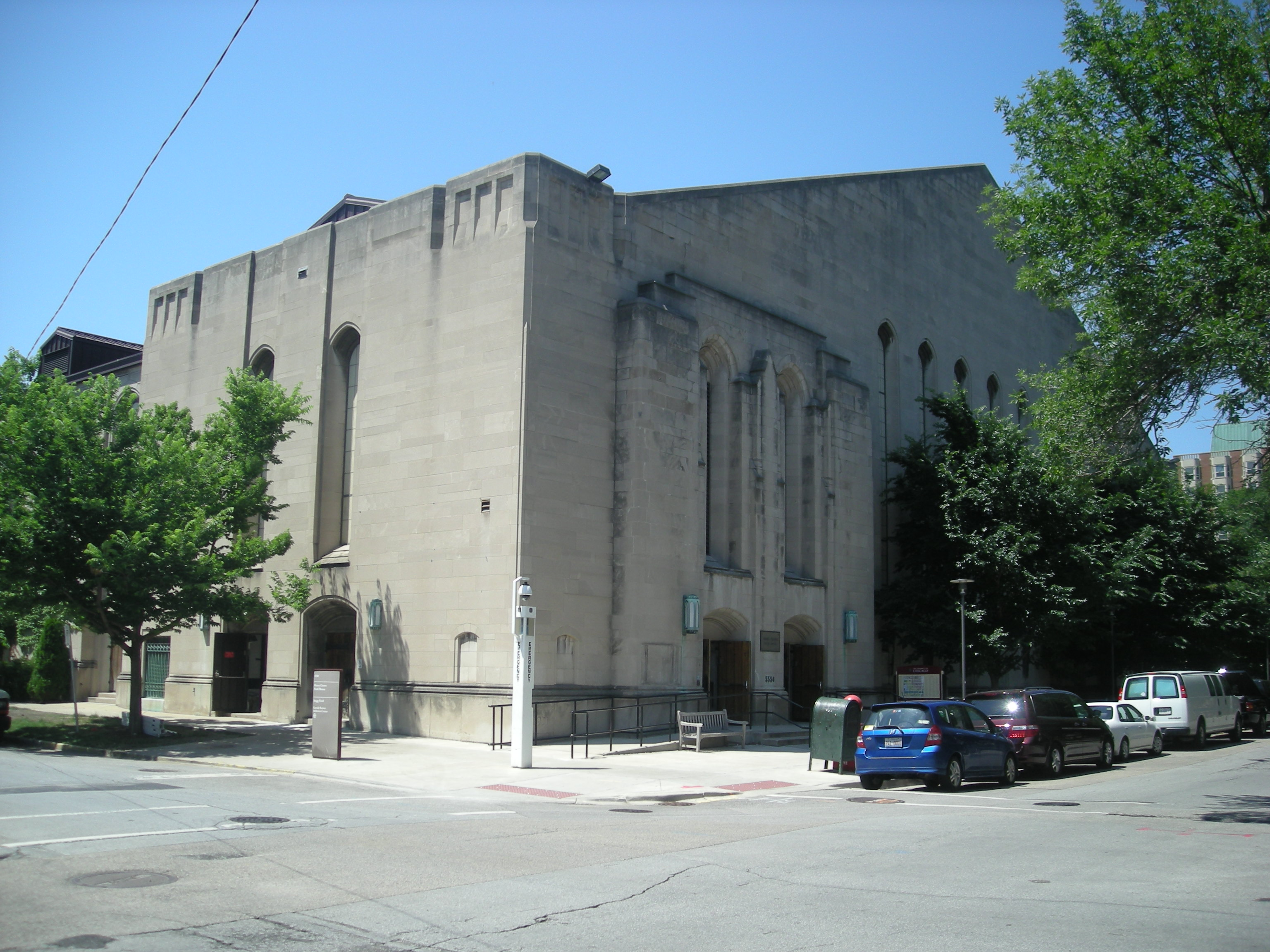
Henry Crown Field House

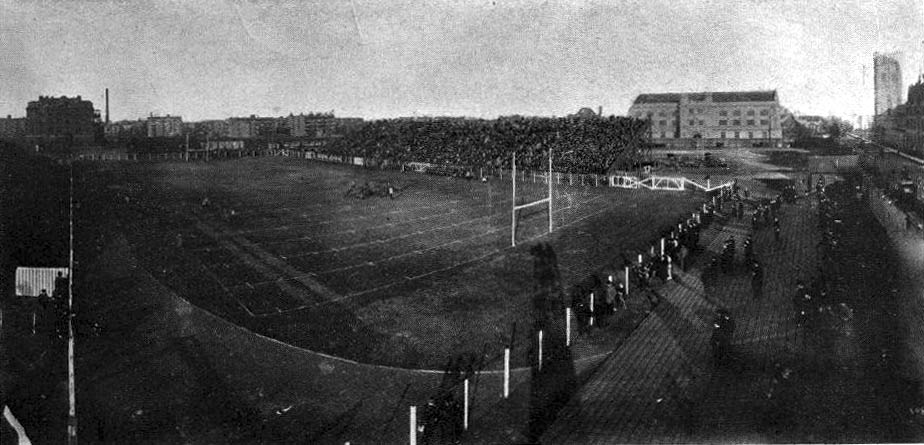
Former Stagg Field (1904)

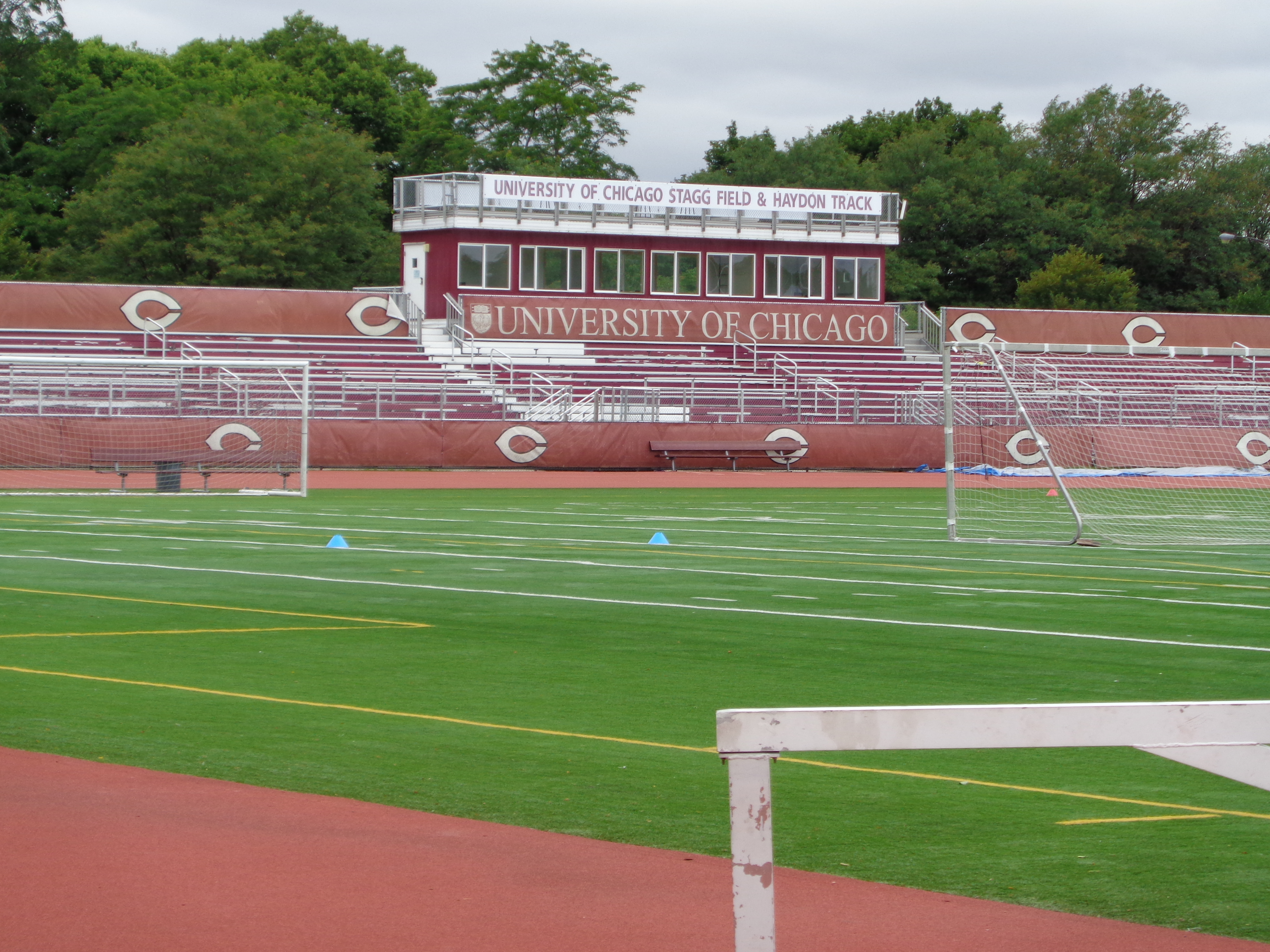
Current Stagg Field

Venue	Sport(s)	Open.	Ref.
Gerald Ratner Athletics Center	Basketball (2003–); Volleyball; Wrestling; Swimming	2003	
Henry Crown Field House	Indoor track and field Racquetball; Handball; Basketball (1933–2003)	1932	
Stagg Field	Football; Soccer; Outdoor track and field	2013	

=== Former ===
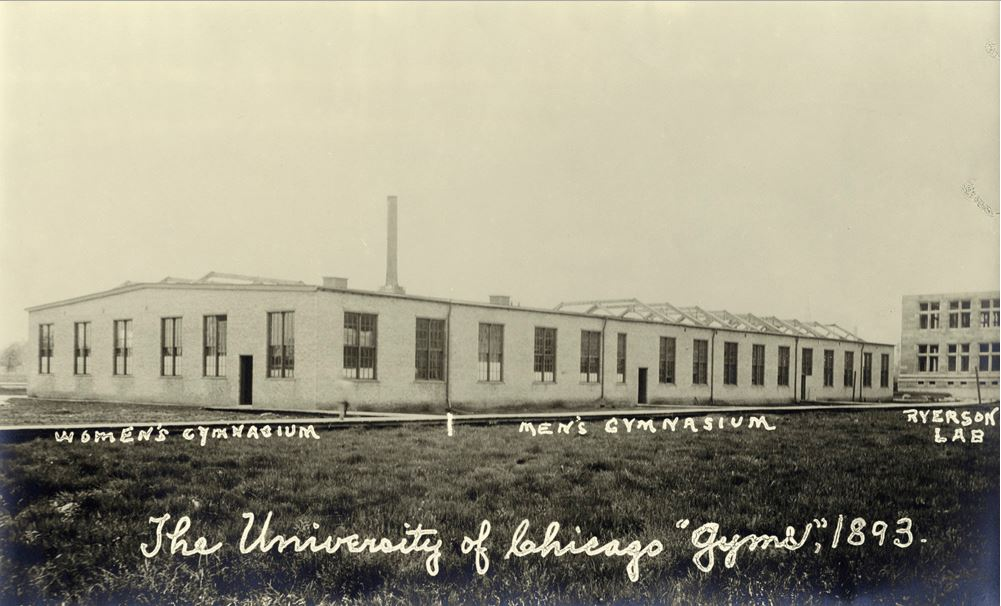
Men's Gymnasium, demolished in 1904

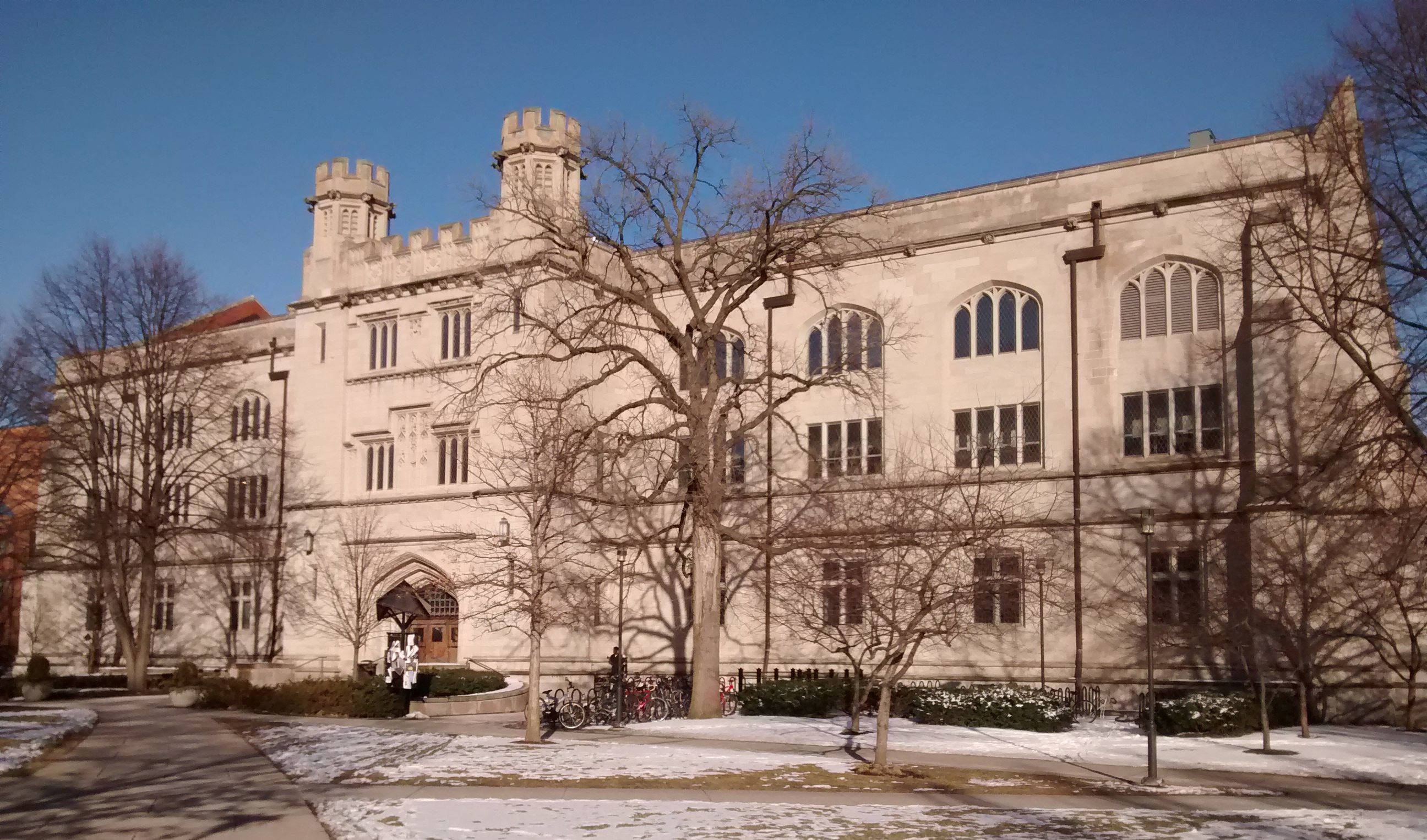
Bartlett in February 2016, now a dining hall

Venue	Sport(s)	Open.	Clos.	Ref.
Men's Gymnasium	Basketball	1891	1904	
Bartlett Hall	Basketball	1904	– (Note: Repurposed as a dining hall.)	

== Championships ==
=== National and NCAA championships ===
- Basketball (poll): 1906–07, 1907–08, and 1908–09 (Helms Athletic Foundation)
- Football (poll): 1905 (Helms Athletic Foundation), 1913 (Parke H. Davis)
- Men's Gymnastics: 1938 (team title), 9 individual champions
- Men's Soccer: 2022
- Men's Tennis: 2022
- Men's Track & Field (Outdoor): 7 individual champions
- Kris Alden: 1989 Men's Swimming Individual Champion
- Rhaina Echols: 1999 Women's Cross Country Individual Champion, 2000 Women's Indoor (3,000-meter run and 5,000-meter run) and 2000 Women's Outdoor Individual Track Champion (5,000-meter run)
- Tom Haxton: 2004 Men's Outdoor Track & Field Individual Champion (10,000-meter run)
- Adeoye Mabogunje: 2004 Men's Outdoor Track & Field Individual Champion (Triple Jump)
- Peter Wang: 1991 & 1992 Wrestling Individual Champion
- Liz Lawton: 2010 Women's Outdoor Track & Field Individual Champion (5,000-meter run and 10,000-meter run)
- Michael Bennett: 2014 Men's Indoor Track & Field Individual Champion (Pole Vault)
- Michelle Dobbs: 2016 Women's Indoor Track & Field Individual Champion (800-meter run)
- Khia Kurtenbach: 2017 Women's Cross Country Individual Champion

=== University Athletic Association championships ===
- Men's Basketball: 1997, 1998, 2000, 2001, 2007, 2008
- Women's Basketball: 1989, 2008, 2011, 2012
- Men's Cross Country: 2002, 2004
- Women's Cross Country: 1992, 1993, 2012, 2013, 2022
- Football: 1998, 2000, 2005, 2010, 2014
- Men's Soccer: 2001, 2009, 2014, 2016, 2017, 2018, 2019, 2022
- Women's Soccer: 1994, 1996, 1999, 2010
- Softball: 1996
- Men's Track & Field (Indoor): 2002, 2008
- Women's Track & Field (Indoor): 2008, 2010, 2014, 2015, 2018
- Women's Track & Field (Outdoor): 2015
- Wrestling: 1989, 1990, 1992, 1995, 1997, 1998, 2001, 2002, 2003, 2004, 2005, 2007, 2009, 2010, 2011
- Women's Tennis: 2010, 2012, 2022
- Men's Tennis: 2018, 2022

=== Midwest Conference championships ===
All championships listed here were won when the league was known as the Midwest Collegiate Athletic Conference, and only sponsored men's sports. The Midwest Conference was established in its current form in 1994 with the merger of the MCAC and Midwest Athletic Conference for Women.

- Men's Soccer: 1978
- Men's Tennis: 1984
- Women's Tennis: 1983
- Men's Track & Field (Indoor): 1980
- Women's Track & Field (Outdoor): 1983, 1984

=== Big Ten Conference championships ===
- Baseball: 1896, 1897, 1898, 1899, 1913
- Men's Basketball: 1907, 1908, 1909, 1910, 1920, 1924
- Men's Fencing: 1927–28, 1933–34, 1935–36, 1936–37, 1937–38, 1938–39, 1939–40, 1940–41
- Football: 1899, 1905, 1907, 1908, 1913, 1922, 1924
- Men's Golf: 1922, 1924, 1926
- Men's Gymnastics: 1909, 1914, 1917, 1920, 1921, 1922, 1924, 1926, 1927, 1928, 1930, 1931, 1932, 1933, 1934
- Men's Swimming: 1916, 1919, 1921
- Men's Tennis: 1910, 1913, 1914, 1915, 1916, 1918, 1920, 1921, 1922, 1923, 1924, 1929, 1930, 1931, 1933, 1934, 1935, 1937, 1938, 1939
- Men's Track & Field (Indoor): 1911, 1915, 1917
- Men's Track & Field (Outdoor): 1905, 1908, 1917

== Fight song ==
Wave the Flag (For Old Chicago) is the fight song for the Maroons. Gordon Erickson wrote the lyrics in 1929. The tune was adapted from Miami University's "Marching Song" written in 1908 by Raymond H. Burke, a University of Chicago graduate who joined Miami's faculty in 1906.

The song is traditionally sung by the players at midfield after all home victories.

== See also ==
- The University of Chicago Band
