= Gérald =

Gérald is a French male given name, a variant of the old Géraud and more common Gérard, both equivalent to Gerald in English.

People with the name include:

- Gérald Caussé (born 1963), French religious leader
- Gérald Mossé, French jockey
- Gérald de Palmas, French recording artist and singer
- Gérald Leblanc, Canadian poet

Less frequently the French name also occurs as the English name, without the accent:

- Gerald Messadié, Egypt-born French writer

It is also occasionally a French surname, as in:

- Jim Gérald (1889–1958), French actor
