= Jerry (given name) =

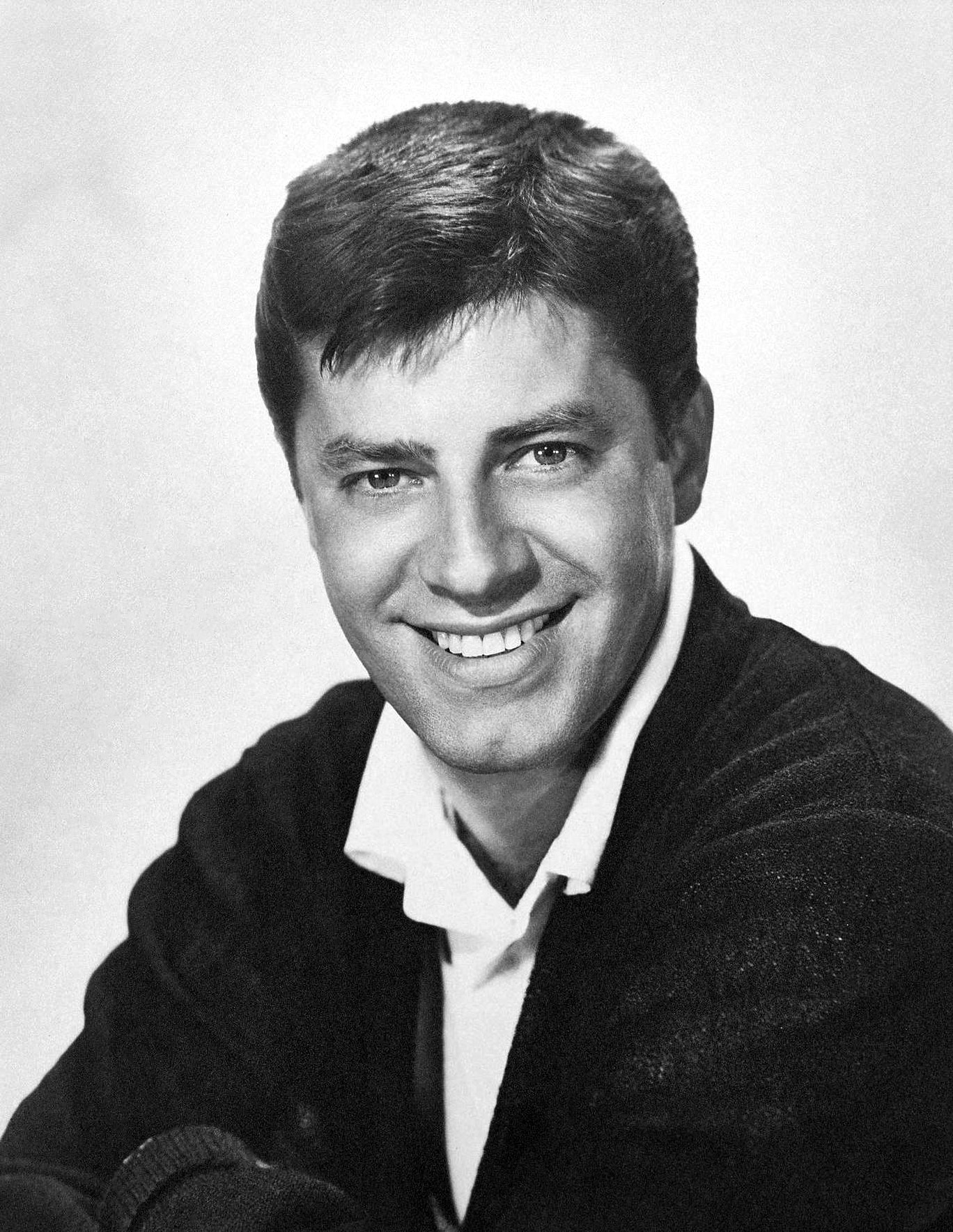
- Jerry Lewis in 1957
- Pronunciation: /ˈdʒɛri/ JAIR-ee
- Gender: Unisex (Male/Female)

Origin
- Region of origin: English

Other names
- Related names: Gerald, Gerard, Gerry, Jared, Jeremy, Jeremiah, Jermaine, Jerome

Jerry is a given name, usually used for males. It is of Old English origin, and sometimes can be spelled Gerry. It is a diminutive form (hypocorism) of Gerald, Gerard, Jared, Jeremy, Jeremiah, Jermaine, or Jerome.

== People ==
=== Arts and entertainment ===
- Jerry Ross Barrish (born 1939), American artist
- Jerry Birn (1923–2009), American television writer
- Jerry Blavat (1940–2023), American radio disc jockey
- Jerry Dolyn Brown (1942–2016), Alabama folk artist and traditional potter
- Jerry Bruckheimer (born 1943), American film and television producer
- Jerry Burchard (1931–2011), American photographer, educator
- Jerry Butler (born 1939), American soul singer and songwriter
- Jerry Cantrell (born 1966), American guitarist and vocalist for grunge band Alice in Chains
- Jerry Clower (1926–1998), American country comedian
- Jerry Dixon (actor), American actor
- Jerry Dunphy (1921–2002), American television news anchor
- Jerry Garcia (1942–1995), American guitarist and vocalist for the American rock band The Grateful Dead
- Jerry Goldsmith (1929–2004), American composer and conductor
- Jerry Hall (born 1956), American model and actress
- Jerry Harris (born 1999), American television personality
- Jerry Hausner (1909–1993), American actor
- Jerry Haynes (1927–2011), American actor
- Jerry Heil (born 1995), stage name of Yana Oleksandrivna Shemaieva, Ukrainian singer, songwriter and YouTuber
- Jerry Herman (1931–2019), American composer and lyricist
- Jerry Houser (born 1952), American actor
- Jerry Juhl (1938–2005), American television writer
- Jerry King, cartoonist
- Jerry Kuehl (1931–2018), American historian and TV producer
- Gerald Lamb, known as Jerry Lamb (born 1970), Hong Kong actor, singer, television presenter, and DJ
- Jerry Lee Lewis (1935–2022), American singer, songwriter and pianist
- Jerry Leiber (1933–2011), American songwriter and record producer
- Jerry Lewis (1926–2017), American comedian, actor, film producer, writer, film director, singer and humanitarian
- Jerry Maren (1920–2018), American actor
- Jerry Martin (composer), American jazz and New Age composer and video game creator
- Jerry Naylor (1939–2019), American country and rock and roll recording artist
- Jerry Nelson (1934–2012), American actor and puppeteer
- Jerry O'Connell (born 1974), American actor
- Jerry Orbach (1935–2004), American actor
- Jerry Pinkney (1939–2021), American illustrator and writer of children's literature
- Jerry Ragovoy (1930–2011), American songwriter and record producer
- Jerry Reed (1937–2008), American country singer and guitarist
- Jerry Rivera (born 1973), Puerto Rican salsa singer and songwriter
- Jerry Roush (born 1986), former vocalist of the metalcore bands Sky Eats Airplane, Of Mice & Men, and Glass Cloud
- Jerry Scott (born 1955), American cartoonist and writer
- Jerry Seinfeld (born 1954), American comedian, actor and writer
- Jerry Spinelli (born 1941), American writer of young adult fiction
- Jerry Springer (1944–2023), American TV personality and former mayor of Cincinnati, Ohio
- Jerry Stiller (1927–2020), American actor and comedian
- Jerry Supiran (born 1973), American actor
- Jerry Trainor (born 1977), American actor and comedian
- Jerry Vale (1930–2014), American singer
- Jerry Van Dyke (1931–2018), American actor and comedian
- Jerry Velázquez (born 1990), Mexican actor and singer
- Jerry Wallace (1928–2008), American singer
- Jerry Weintraub (1937–2015), American film and television producer
- Jerry Yan (born 1977), Taiwanese actor

=== Business ===
- Jerry Buss (1933–2013), American businessman, sports teams owner, real estate investor, chemist, and philanthropist
- Jerry Colangelo (born 1939), American businessman and sports executive
- Jerry Greenfield (born 1951), American businessman, co-founder of Ben & Jerry's ice cream company
- Jerry Jones (born 1942), American businessman and sport team owner
- Jerry Yang (born 1968), Taiwanese-American co-founder and former CEO of Yahoo!

=== Politics ===
- Jerry Bauerly (born 1943), American educator, farmer, businessman, and Minnesota State Representative
- Jerry Brown (born 1938), 34th and 39th Governor of California
- Jerry Gaetz (1914–1964), member of the North Dakota Senate
- Jerry Mateparae (born 1954), New Zealand Governor-General Designate and former Chief of the New Zealand Defence Force
- Jerry H. Money (1946–1990) American politician
- Jerry Rawlings (1947–2020), 1st President of 4th Republic of Ghana
- Jerry Sanders (politician) (born 1950), former San Diego mayor and chief of police

=== Sports ===
- Jerry Anderson (1953–1989), American football safety player
- Jerry Anderson (diver) (1932–2009), Puerto Rican diver
- Jerry Balisok (1955–2013), American professional wrestler
- Jerry Barnett (born 1951), American racing driver
- Jerry Belmontes (born 1988), American professional boxer
- Jerry Blackwell (1949–1995), American professional wrestler
- Jerry Bohlander (born 1974), American former mixed martial artist
- Jerry Bowman (born 1962), American NASCAR driver
- Jerry Brown (gridiron football) (1987–2012), American football player
- Jerry Buchek (1942–2019), American baseball player
- Jerry Collins (1980–2015), professional rugby union player
- Jerry Deets (1947–2002), Paralympian athlete from the United States
- Jerry Goff (born 1964), American baseball player
- Jerry Graham (1931–1997), American professional wrestler
- Jerry Gustafson (born 1934), American football player
- Jerry Hinsdale (born 1936), American competitive swimmer
- Jerry Jacobs (American football) (born 1997), American football player
- Jerry Jeudy (born 1999), American football player
- Jerry Kelly (born 1966), American professional golfer
- Jerry Kiernan (1953–2021), Irish long-distance runner
- Jerry Kindall (1935–2017), American baseball player
- Jerry Lawler (born 1949), American musician, professional wrestler and commentator
- Jerry Lyne, American basketball player and coach
- Jerry Lynn (born 1963), American professional wrestler
- Jerry Lynn (baseball) (1916–1972), Major League Baseball second baseman
- Jerry Mansfield (1892–1960), American football player
- Jerry Marion (born 1944), American football player
- Jerry Martin (ski jumper) (born 1950), American former ski jumper
- Jerry Mays (defensive lineman) (1939–1994), American professional football player
- Jerry Moffatt (born 1963), British rock climber and climbing author
- Jerry Montgomery (born 1979), American football player and coach
- Jerry Narron (born 1956), American baseball player, manager, and coach
- Jerry Newsom (born 1946), American former college basketball player
- Jerry Norman (basketball) (born 1929), American basketball coach
- Jerry Oliver (racing driver) (1944–2004), American racing driver
- Jerry Owens (born 1981), American baseball player
- Jerry Page (born 1961), American boxer
- Jerry Pate (born 1953), American professional golfer
- Jerry Pulamte (born 1999), Indian footballer
- Jerry Quarry (1945–1999), American professional boxer
- Jerry Rice (born 1962), American football player
- Jerry Saggs (born 1964), American professional wrestler
- Jerry Sandusky (born 1944), American football coach and convicted sex offender
- Jerry Schild (1954–2012), American NASCAR Cup Series driver
- Shang Juncheng, also known as Jerry Shang (born 2005), Chinese professional tennis player
- Jerry Simon (born 1968), American-Israeli basketball player
- Jerry Sitoe (born 1990), Mozambican footballer
- Jerry Sloan (1942–2020), American basketball player and coach
- Jerry Stackhouse (born 1974), American basketball player
- Jerry Stubbs (born 1951), American professional wrestler
- Jerry Tarkanian (born 1930), American retired college basketball head coach known as "Tark the Shark"
- Jerry Tillery (born 1996), American football player
- Jerry Tuwai (born 1989), Fiji rugby union player
- Jerry Watford (1930–1993), American football player
- Jerry West (1938–2024), American basketball player

=== Other ===
- Jerry Balentine, American osteopathic physician and academic administrator
- Jerry Brudos (1939–2006), American serial killer
- Jerry Coleby-Williams, Australian conservationist, horticulturalist and plant curator
- Jerry Coyne (born 1949), American biologist
- Jerry Doggett (1916–1997), American sportscaster
- Jerry Dunphy (1921–2002), American television news anchor
- Jerry P. Eaton (1926–2004), American geologist
- Jerry Falwell (1933–2007), American Baptist pastor and televangelist
- Jerry Falwell Jr. (born 1962), American attorney and former president of Liberty University
- Jerry Hirshberg (1939–2019), American automotive designer
- Jerry Johnston (born 1959), American clergyman
- Jerry Kang, American legal scholar and academic administrator
- Jerry Krause (missionary) (disappeared 2013), American aviator
- Jerry Lawson (1940–2011), American electronics engineer working in video games
- Jerry Little (1956–1994), American serial killer
- Jerry Magee (1928–2019), American journalist
- Jerry McCabe (1943–1996), Irish garda
- Jerry Walter McFadden (1948–1999), American serial killer
- Jerry Parr (1930–2015), United States Secret Service agent
- Jerry Spraggins (born 1954), American murderer, rapist and suspected serial killer
- Jerry D. Roe (born 1936), American professor
- Jerry Taft (1943–2020), American meteorologist
- Jerry Whitworth (born 1939), member of the Walker family spy ring
- Jerry Yang, American winner of the 2007 World Series of Poker Main Event
- Xiangzhong "Jerry" Yang (1959–2009), Chinese-American biotechnology scientist who worked on cloning

== Fictional characters ==
- Jerry, a fictional character from the game Undertale
- Jerry, a character in the 1998 American comedy movie My Giant
- Jerry, the name of multiple pre-life beings in film Soul
- Jerry, the second main character from The Zoo Story by Edward Albee
- Dr. Jerry Attricks, a fictional character in the YouTube series Scott the Woz
- Jerry Bear, a fictional bear in the Sprout show Pajanimals
- Jerry Cramer, a character in the 1990 American comedy movie Ski Patrol
- Jerry Cruncher, in the novel A Tale of Two Cities by Charles Dickens
- Jerry Generazzo, a character in the 2026 American animated film Hoppers
- Jerry Gergich, a fictional character in the TV series Parks and Recreation
- Jerry Gourd, a fictional character in the Christian video series VeggieTales
- Jerry Hewitt, a character in the 2008 Hallmark Channel television movie The Nanny Express
- Cpt. Jerry Lawson, a character in the 1983 American techno-thriller movie WarGames
- Jerry Lewis, a fictional character in the TV series Totally Spies!
- the title character in the film Jerry Maguire, portrayed by Tom Cruise
- Jerry Martin, character in the film The Divorcee
- Jerry Martinez, the main antagonist of the video game Grand Theft Auto: Vice City Stories
- Jerry Miller, in the film Tammy
- Jerry Mouse, in the Tom and Jerry cartoons
- Jerry, the main protagonist of the TV series Three Friends... and Jerry
- Jerry Muller, a character in the 1934 film The Man Who Changed His Name
- Jerry Pierce, a character in Tag, played by Jeremy Renner
- Jerry Recycled Batteries, also known as Peterbilt, a Peterbilt 362 red truck in the 2006 Disney/Pixar animated film Cars
- Jerry Russo, from the television series Wizards of Waverly Place
- Jerry Seinfeld (character), eponymous character in the American sitcom Seinfeld
- Jerry Slugworth, a scare floor manager in the 2001 Disney/Pixar animated film Monsters, Inc.
- Jerry Smith, a fictional character in the American animated series Rick and Morty
- Jerry Stokes, in the short-lived television series Welcome to Eltingville
- Jerry the Tyke, a fictional dog who had his own cartoon series between 1925 and 1927

== See also ==
- Jer (disambiguation)
- Jeri
- Geri (disambiguation)
