= Geraldino =

Geraldino may refer to:

- Geraldino (footballer) (Geraldo Antônio Martins; 1940-2018), Brazilian footballer
- José Augusto Geraldino (born 1971), Dominican judoka
- Vicbart Geraldino (born 1978), Dominican judoka

== See also ==
- Geraldine (disambiguation)
