= Gerad =

Gerad may refer to:

- A Somali court title for a king or sultan
- Gerad Adams (born 1978), a Canadian ice hockey player and coach
- Gerad Christian-Lichtenhan (born 2001), American football player
- Gerad Parker (born 1981), an American football coach
- Gerad Tehran Club, an Iranian professional wrestling team
- Edgar Figaro, a fictional king from Final Fantasy VI who uses "Gerad" as a pseudonym

== See also ==
- Gerald, a male given name
- Gerard, a male given name
