= Jeral =

Jeral is a given name. Notable people with the name include:

- Jeral Davis (born 1984), American former professional basketball player
- Jeral Skelton (born 1999), Australian rugby player

== See also ==
- Jerald
