= Chicago Maroons women's basketball =

- University: University of Chicago
- Head coach: Michelle Gardner-Bilek (1st season)
- Arena: Ratner Athletics Center (capacity: 1,658)
- Conference: University Athletic Association (UAA)
- Nickname: Maroons
- Colors: Maroon and white

NCAA Division I tournament appearances
- Division III; 1995, 2008, 2010, 2011, 2012, 2016, 2017

Conference regular-season champions
- 1988, 2008, 2011, 2012, 2015, 2017

The Chicago Maroons women's basketball team is an NCAA Division III college basketball team competing in the University Athletic Association. Home games are played at the Gerald Ratner Athletics Center, located on the University of Chicago's campus in Chicago.

The team's head coach is currently Michelle Gardner-Bilek.

== Season-by-season record ==
As of the 2015–16 season, the Maroons are 610–414 (.596) in 45 seasons of play. They are 218–181 in UAA play since joining in 1987. Aaron Roussell has the best coaching record in Maroon history, winning 161 games while losing only 50 (for a .763 percentage) in eight years as coach.

| Season | Record | Coach | Conference Record |
|---|---|---|---|
| 1971–72 | 3–4 | Patricia Kirby | n/a |
| 1972–73 | 0–6 | Patricia Kirby | n/a |
| 1973–74 | 8–6 | Patricia Kirby | n/a |
| 1974–75 | 13–7 | Patricia Kirby | n/a |
| 1975–76 | 13–8 | Patricia Kirby | n/a |
| 1976–77 | 13–9 | Patricia Kirby | n/a |
| 1977–78 | 12–8 | Marcia Hurt | n/a |
| 1978–79 | 10–7 | Marcia Hurt | n/a |
| 1979–80 | 5–12 | Marcia Hurt | n/a |
| 1980–81 | 13–6 | Diann Nestel | n/a |
| 1981–82 | 8–14 | Diann Nestel | n/a |
| 1982–83 | 15–6 | Diann Nestel | n/a |
| 1983–84 | 15–6 | Diann Nestel | n/a |
| 1984–85 | 12–9 | Kevin McCarthy | n/a |
| 1985–86 | 15–7 | Susan Brower | n/a |
| 1986–87 | 11–11 | Susan Brower | n/a |
| 1987–88 | 14–8 | Susan Brower | 3–4 (5th) |
| 1988–89 | 18–7 | Susan Brower | 9–3 (1st) |
| 1989–90 | 21–4 | Susan Brower | 11–3 (2nd) |
| 1990–91 | 14–11 | Susan Brower | 6–8 (5th) |
| 1991–92 | 8–17 | Susan Brower | 4–10 (6th) |
| 1992–93 | 14–11 | Susan Brower | 7–7 (4th) |
| 1993–94 | 13–12 | Susan Zawacki | 6–8 (4th) |
| 1994–95 | 19–7 | Susan Zawacki | 9–5 (4th) |
| 1995–96 | 12–13 | Susan Zawacki | 5–9 (4th) |
| 1996–97 | 12–13 | Susan Zawacki | 5–9 (4th) |
| 1997–98 | 14–11 | Susan Zawacki | 6–8 (4th) |
| 1998–99 | 9–16 | Susan Zawacki | 4–10 (5th) |
| 1999-00 | 14–11 | Susan Zawacki | 9–6 (3rd) |
| 2000–01 | 15–9 | Jennifer Kroll | 7–8 (4th) |
| 2001–02 | 9–15 | Jennifer Kroll | 5–9 (6th) |
| 2002–03 | 11–14 | Jennifer Kroll | 5–9 (6th) |
| 2003–04 | 10–15 | Jennifer Kroll | 5–9 (6th) |
| 2004–05 | 16–9 | Aaron Roussell | 9–5 (4th) |
| 2005–06 | 17–8 | Aaron Roussell | 6–8 (5th) |
| 2006–07 | 18–7 | Aaron Roussell | 7–7 (5th) |
| 2007–08 | 22–6 | Aaron Roussell | 11–3 (1st) |
| 2008–09 | 17–8 | Aaron Roussell | 8–6 (4th) |
| 2009–10 | 19–7 | Aaron Roussell | 11–3 (2nd) |
| 2010–11 | 25–4 | Aaron Roussell | 14–0 (1st) |
| 2011–12 | 27–1 | Aaron Roussell | 14–0 (1st) |
| 2012–13 | 7–18 | Carissa Sain Knoche | 3–11 (T-7th) |
| 2013–14 | 15–10 | Carissa Sain Knoche | 9–5 (T-2nd) |
| 2014–15 | 18–7 | Carissa Sain Knoche | 12–2 (T-1st) |
| 2015–16 | 16–9 | Carissa Sain Knoche | 8–6 (T-3rd) |

== Tournament history ==
The Maroons have reached the NCAA Division III Women's Basketball Championship five times (1995, 2008, 2010, 2011, 2012). In 1995, they lost in the first round to Millikin 70–53. They reached the Round of 16 in 2008 (with wins over St. Thomas (Minnesota) and St. Norbert) before a loss to Kean 70–56. In 2010, they lost in the First Round to Simpson 66–53. In 2011, they reached the Quarterfinals (with wins over Hanover, Calvin and Greensboro) before a loss to Washington-St. Louis 63–58. In 2012, they reached the Round of 16 (with wins over Monmouth and Wisconsin-Eau Claire) before a loss to Calvin 68–50.
