= Geraldine =

Geraldine may refer to:

== People ==
- Geraldine (name), the feminine form of the first name Gerald, with list of people thus named.
- The Geraldines, Irish dynasty descended from the Anglo-Norman Gerald FitzWalter de Windsor
- Geraldine of Albania, the Queen Consort of Zog I.

== Places ==
- Geraldine, New Zealand
  - Geraldine (New Zealand electorate)
- Geraldine, Alabama, United States
- Geraldine, Montana, United States

== Characters ==
- Geraldine, a character in the poem "Christabel" by Samuel Taylor Coleridge
- Geraldine McQueen (character), a fictional singer, played by Peter Kay
- Geraldine Jones (character), a comedy persona of Flip Wilson
- Geraldine Granger, a fictional character in the British sitcom The Vicar of Dibley
- Geraldine Littlejohn, a character in the film Cyberbully

== Films ==
- Geraldine (1929 film), a 1929 American romantic comedy film
- Geraldine (1953 film), a 1953 American comedy film
- Geraldine (2000 film), a 2000 French animated short film

== Music ==
- Geraldine, an opera by Michael William Balfe
- "Geraldine" (song), by Glasvegas
- Geraldine, stage name of Geraldine Brannigan

== Other ==
- "Geraldine", adjective (e.g. "Geraldine cause", "Geraldine loyalties") meaning 'having to do with the FitzGerald dynasty' in medieval Ireland
- USS Geraldine (SP-1011), a United States Navy patrol boat in commission from 1917 to 1918

== See also ==
- Geraldino (disambiguation)
