= Geraldine (name) =

- Pronunciation: /dʒɛrəlˈdiːn/ jerr-əl-DEEN
- Gender: Female

Origin
- Origin: French, Old German
- Meaning: Spear Ruler

Other names
- Related names: Gerald, Jerald, Jeraldine

Geraldine is a feminine form of the first name Gerald. Notable people with the name include:

- Geraldine Aves (1898–1986), British civil servant
- Geraldine Brannigan (born 1956), Irish singer
- Geraldine Chaplin (born 1944), American actress
- Geraldine Connor (1952–2011), British ethnomusicologist, theatre director, composer and performer
- Geraldine L. Daniels (1933–2012), New York politician
- Geraldine Farrar (1882–1967), American opera soprano
- Geraldine Ferraro (1935–2011), United States congresswoman and 1984 vice presidential candidate
- Geraldine Fitzgerald (1913–2005), Irish actress
- Geraldina Guerra Garcés (born 1975), Ecuadorian campaigner against femicide
- Geraldine Hakewill (born 1987), Australian actress
- Geri Halliwell (born 1972), former Spice Girl
- Geraldine James (born 1950), English actress
- Geraldine Laybourne (born 1947), American television executive
- Géraldine Martineau (born 1988), French actress
- Geraldine McCaughrean (born 1951), British author
- Geraldine McCormick (1924–2005), American politician
- Geraldine McEwan (1932–2015), English actress
- Geraldine O'Grady (1932–2025), Irish classical violinist
- Geraldine Page (1924–1987), American actress
- Geraldine Roman (born 1967), Filipino journalist and politician
- Geraldine Smith (actress)
- Geraldine Smith (politician)
- Geraldine Somerville (born 1967), Irish actress
- Geraldine Viswanathan (born 1995), Australian actress

== See also ==
- Geraldine (disambiguation)
