= Gerald C. Kelleher =

American military officer (1908–2003)

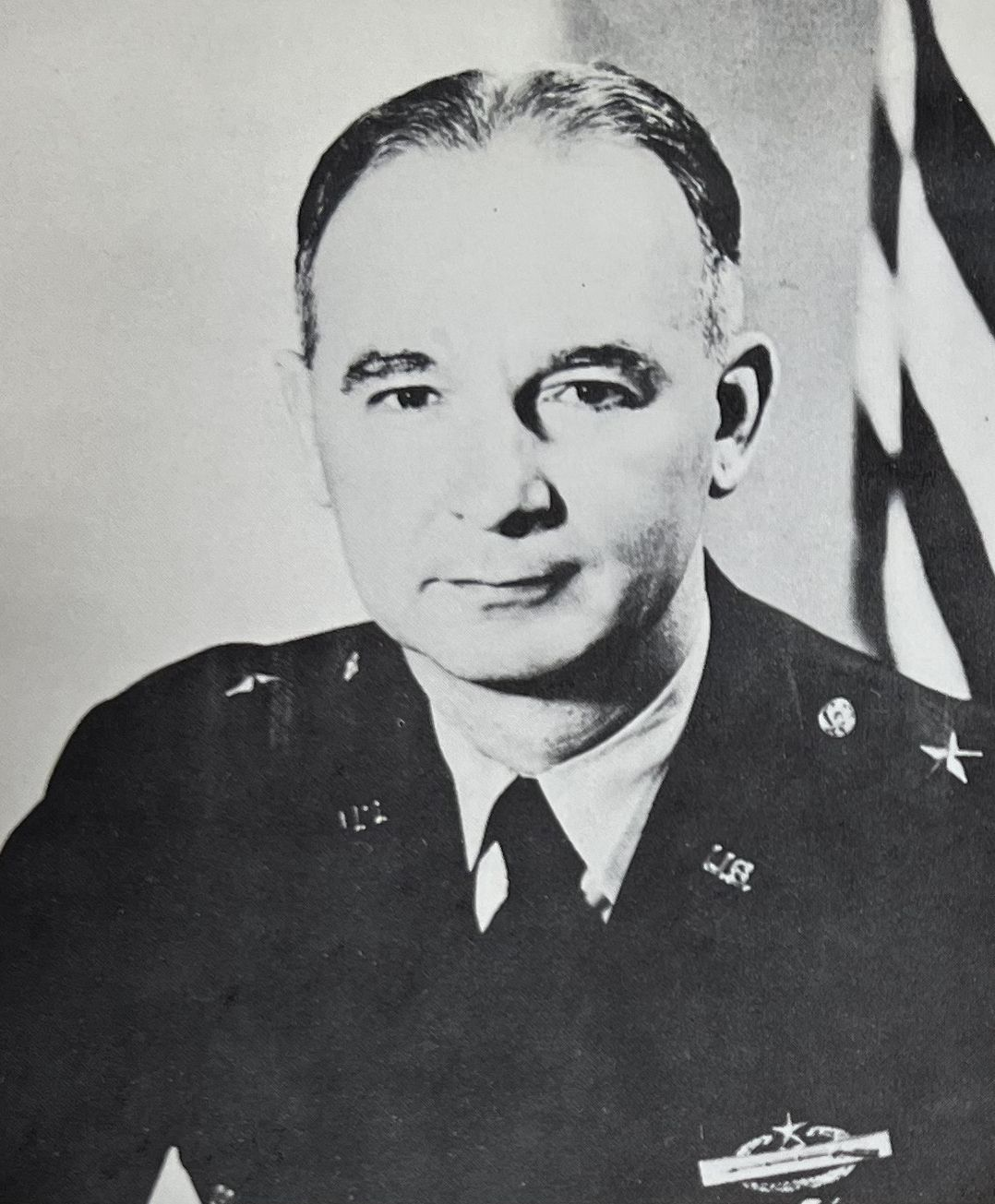
- General Kelleher in uniform
- Born: July 8, 1908; Albany, New York, U.S.
- Died: November 23, 2003 (aged 95); Daytona Beach, Florida, U.S.
- Burial place: Arlington National Cemetery
- Military career
- Allegiance: United States
- Branch: United States Army
- Service years: 1941–1957
- Rank: Brigadier General
- Commands: 1st Battalion, 26th Infantry Regiment, 1st Infantry Division; 3d Battalion, 415th Infantry Regiment, 104th Infantry Division; 414th Infantry Regiment, 104th Infantry Division; 35th Infantry Regiment, 25th Infantry Division
- Conflicts: World War II; Korean War
- Awards: Distinguished Service Cross (United States) with Bronze Oak Leaf Cluster; Army Distinguished Service Medal; Silver Star Medal with 6 Oak Leaf Clusters; Legion of Merit; Bronze Star Medal with Valor Device; Purple Heart; American Defense Service Medal; American Campaign Medal; European-African-Middle Eastern Campaign Medal; World War II Victory Medal; Army of Occupation Medal (Germany); National Defense Service Medal; Korean Service Medal; United Nations Service Medal; Republic of Korea War Service Medal; Army Presidential Unit Citation with 2 Bronze Oak Leaf Clusters; Republic of Korea Presidential Unit Citation; Combat Infantryman Badge with Star (Second Award); British Distinguished Service Order; French Croix de Guerre with Palm; Soviet Order of Suvorov Third Class; Honorary Colonel in the 2nd Spahis, a famous French Cavalry unit

Gerald C. Kelleher (1908–2003) was an American military officer.

== Military service ==
=== World War II ===
In November 1942, First Lieutenant Gerald C. Kelleher served in the 26th Infantry Regiment, 1st Infantry Division (United States)(the Big Red One), and participated in the U.S. landing in North Africa. He served as a platoon leader, later being promoted to captain and company commander, and then, as a major, to battalion executive officer (XO). He was later given a battlefield promotion to lieutenant colonel. He was twice captured by Rommel's Afrika Corps and escaped both times. In 1944–45, he served in Europe as commander of a battalion, and then a regiment, of the 104th Infantry Division (United States) (the Timberwolves).

On November 10, 1942, then-major Gerald C. Kelleher was commanding officer, 1st Battalion, 26th Infantry Regiment, 1st Infantry Division, in action at Djebel Murdjadjo, Algeria. During the Oran offensive, he personally led elements of the battalion in a successful assault under heavy enemy fire, earning him the Silver Star Medal.

On March 28, 1943, then-lieutenant colonel Kelleher skillfully led his battalion across unfamiliar enemy terrain, seizing and holding its objective despite heavy odds, which earned him another Silver Star Medal.

On April 27, 1943, in the vicinity of Beja, Tunisia, Kelleher reorganized a company under heavy enemy fire, enabling it to repel the enemy, earning him a second Silver Star Medal.

On October 29, 1944, Kelleher, while commanding the 3rd Battalion, 415th Infantry Regiment, 104th Infantry Division, in Holland, displayed extraordinary heroism and leadership, earning him the Distinguished Service Cross.

Colonel Kelleher headed a U.S. security detail that guarded prisoners at the Nuremberg Trials.

=== Korean War ===
On April 24–25, 1951, Colonel Kelleher was commanding officer of the 35th Infantry Regiment, 25th Infantry Division, in Korea. His aggressive leadership and bravery during a numerically superior enemy attack led to a successful withdrawal with minimal losses, earning him a second Distinguished Service Cross.

== Post-war assignments ==
In February 1956, Kelleher was promoted to brigadier general and served as chief, Army Section Military Assistance Advisory Group, Japan, and later as deputy division commander of the 101st Airborne Division (Screaming Eagles). He was assigned as deputy commanding general of Fort Leonard Wood, Missouri, in December 1957.

In 1981, General Kelleher was hosted by Governor Hugh Carey at the governor's mansion in Albany, New York. The event was held so that the governor could pay off a bet that the general and he made in France in March 1945. A case of beer to the first to reach occupied Cologne. The governor praised his one-time superior as the finest soldier I have ever met in the uniform of the US Army.

== Later years and death ==
Kelleher died on November 23, 2003, in Daytona Beach, Florida. He is buried at Arlington National Cemetery in Arlington, Virginia. His obituary states he was awarded a remarkable seven Silver Star's in his military career.

== Personal life ==
Gerald C. Kelleher was born on July 8, 1908, in Albany, New York, to Mr. and Mrs. Cornelius Kelleher. He was a lifelong resident of Albany. He was married for over 60 years to his childhood sweetheart, the late Mary Rose Kelleher. He also lived and served in Japan as an adviser to the Japanese Army.

== Medals, awards, and badges ==
- Distinguished Service Cross with Bronze Oak Leaf Cluster
- Army Distinguished Service Medal
- Silver Star Medal with 6 Oak Leaf Clusters
- Legion of Merit
- Bronze Star Medal with Valor Device
- Purple Heart
- American Defense Service Medal
- American Campaign Medal
- European-African-Middle Eastern Campaign Medal
- World War II Victory Medal
- Army of Occupation Medal (Germany)
- National Defense Service Medal
- Korean Service Medal
- United Nations Service Medal
- Republic of Korea War Service Medal
- Army Presidential Unit Citation with 2 Bronze Oak Leaf Clusters
- Republic of Korea Presidential Unit Citation
- Combat Infantryman Badge with Star (Second Award)
- British Distinguished Service Order
- French Croix de Guerre with Palm
- Soviet Order of Suvorov Third Class
- Honorary Colonel in the 2nd Spahis, a famous French Cavalry unit
