= Jerry Balentine =

American osteopathic physician and academic administrator

Jerry Balentine is an American osteopathic physician and academic administrator who has served as president of New York Institute of Technology since July 1, 2025.

== Education ==
Balentine earned his bachelor's degree from McDaniel College, then his Doctor of Osteopathic Medicine degree from the Philadelphia College of Osteopathic Medicine. He completed an internship at St. Joseph’s Hospital in Philadelphia and an emergency medicine residency at Lincoln Hospital (Bronx) (formerly Lincoln Medical and Mental Health Center), where he was chief resident.

== Career ==
Balentine held senior leadership roles in hospital administration, including positions as chief medical officer and executive vice president at St. Barnabas Hospital (Bronx).

In 2025, Balentine was appointed to the board of directors of the Long Island Association. His November 18, 2025 op-ed in The Wall Street Journal, "Universities Need More AI, Not Less," discussed how universities should teach AI skills to students to ensure career success. It was followed by an interview with Fox News on November 21, 2025. He also wrote another op-ed, "The College Degree Isn’t Dead. But the Wrong Kind Could Cost You $2 Million," on March 26, 2026 in Fortune as well as an op-ed in Newsday, "How Long Island Can Lead Innovation in a New Era" on July 29, 2026.

Balentine maintains a small goat farm near Woodstock, New York.
