= USS Geraldine =

Patrol vessel of the United States Navy

History

United States
- Name: USS Geraldine
- Namesake: Previous name retained
- Builder: George Lawley & Son, Neponset, Massachusetts
- Completed: 1916
- Acquired: Acquired 24 July 1917; Delivered 8 September 1917
- Commissioned: 13 September 1917
- Stricken: 17 December 1918
- Fate: Returned to owner 7 January 1919
- Notes: Operated as private motorboat Albion and Geraldine 1916-1917 and as Geraldine from 1919

General characteristics
- Type: Patrol vessel
- Tonnage: 22 Gross register tons
- Length: 67 ft (20 m)
- Beam: 13 ft (4.0 m)
- Draft: 4 ft (1.2 m)
- Speed: 11 knots
- Complement: 8
- Armament: 1 × 3-pounder gun; 1 × 1-pounder gun

USS Geraldine (SP-1011) was a United States Navy patrol vessel in commission from 1917 to 1918.

Geraldine was built in 1916 as the private motorboat Albion by George Lawley & Son at Neponset, Massachusetts. She later was renamed Geraldine.

On 24 July 1917, the U.S. Navy acquired Geraldine from her owner, Frederick S. Fish of South Bend, Indiana, for use as a section patrol boat during World War I. Fish delivered her to the Navy at Chicago, Illinois, on 8 September 1917, and she was commissioned as USS Geraldine (SP-1011) on 13 September 1917 with her owner.

Assigned to the 9th Naval District and based at Great Lakes, Illinois, Geraldine patrolled in Lake Michigan until late in 1917, when she was laid up at Chicago for the winter because of the annual icing over of the Great Lakes. Returning to service on Lake Michigan on 6 April 1918 after the spring thaw, Geraldine resumed her patrol and guard ship duties for the rest of World War I. She also served as a dispatch boat in the Sault Ste, Marie, Michigan, area from 12 May 1918 to 19 August 1918.

Geraldine was stricken from the Navy List on 17 December 1918 and the Navy returned her to Fish on 7 January 1919.
