= Gerald Zamponi =

Canadian physiologist and pharmacologist

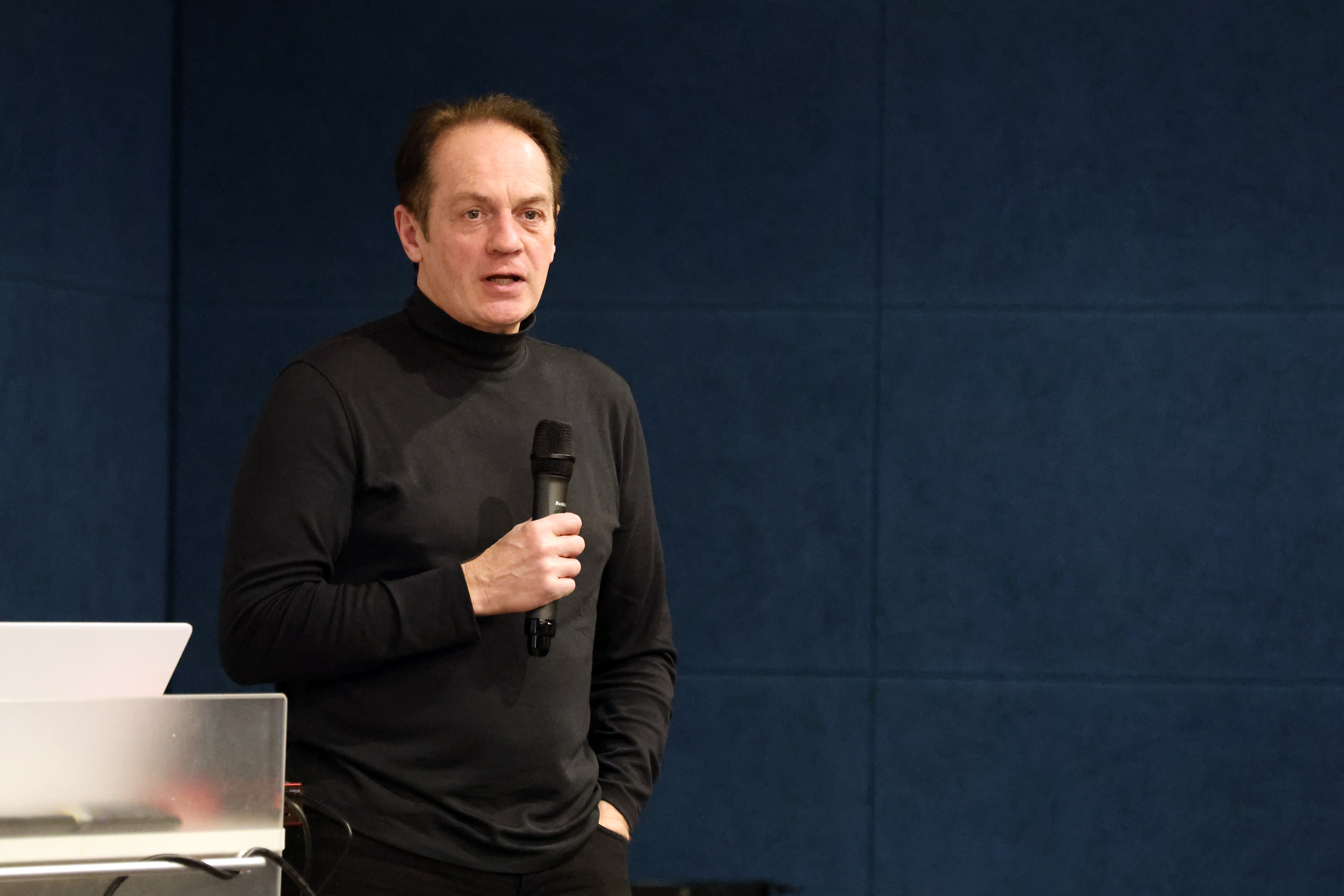
- Education: Ph.D.
- Alma mater: University of Calgary, Johannes Kepler University
- Scientific career
- Fields: Chronic pain
- Workplaces: University of Calgary

Gerald W. Zamponi is a Canadian physiologist and pharmacologist, currently a Canada Research Chair in Molecular Neuroscience at University of Calgary.
