= Gerald Ratner (lawyer) =

American lawyer (1913–2014)

- Born: December 17, 1913
- Died: June 20, 2014 (aged 100); Chicago, Illinois
- Occupation: Lawyer
- Years active: 75 years

Gerald Ratner (December 17, 1913 – June 20, 2014) was a lawyer in Chicago and benefactor to the University of Chicago, his alma mater.

== Early life and education ==
Ratner was born on December 17, 1913. He grew up in the Brighton Park neighborhood of Chicago. His mother, an immigrant from what is now known as Belarus, owned and operated a small grocery store. She raised three kids on her own after Ratner's father left the family when Gerald Ratner was five years old. Because he was a tough kid, people used to call him "Red."

Ratner was the valedictorian of Marshall High School, and earned a scholarship, which covered his first year's tuition at the University of Chicago. Ratner played Varsity baseball, became a member of Phi Beta Kappa and graduated in 1935 with a bachelor's degree from the University of Chicago School of Business. In 1937, he graduated cum laude, Order of the Coif from the University of Chicago Law School.

== Career ==
Ratner served in World War II, entering in November 1942. He was a United States Army policeman stationed in Casablanca. His duty was to process German and Italian prisoners of war. He left the service as Captain in April 1946. Ratner practiced law for more than 75 years, starting in 1937. He cofounded the law firm Gould and Ratner with his U. of C. classmate, Benjamin Gould, in 1949. For over 50 years, Ratner was the counselor to the Crown family. He advised them on deals including the 1961 sale of the Empire State Building.

Ratner was a donor to the University of Chicago. In 1961, he established a student loan fund at the Booth School of Business in memory of his brother J.E. Ratner, former editor-in-chief of Better Homes and Gardens and a former faculty member at the University of Chicago. He donated $15 million for the athletic center that bears his name, Gerald Ratner Athletic Center. He also donated $6 million to the Chicago Initiative, which provides funds for faculty support, community programs, graduate fellowships, and college scholarships. This donation is shared between U. of C.'s Law School and Smart Museum of Art. In April 2006, he funded a gallery in the Smart Museum of Art in honor of his late wife. The University of Chicago gave him the Law School's Distinguished Law Alumni Award in 1999 and the highest honor from the university, the University of Chicago Medal, in 2005.

== Personal life ==
In 1948, Ratner married Eunice Payton. She died in 2005. On June 20, 2014, Ratner died in his sleep at the age of 100 from natural causes.
