= Jerold =

Jerold is a given name. Notable people with the name include:

- Jerold Hoffberger (1919–1999), American businessman
- Jerold Ottley, music director of the Mormon Tabernacle Choir from 1974 to 1999
- Jerold Panas (1928–2018), English author
- Jerold Promes (born 1984), Dutch footballer who currently plays for Sparta Rotterdam
- Jerold Starr (1941–2012), American writer and professor best known as a national reformer of public broadcasting
- Jerold T. Hevener (born 1873, date of death unknown), American film actor and director
- Jerold Wells (1908–1999), English actor
