= Jerry D. Roe =

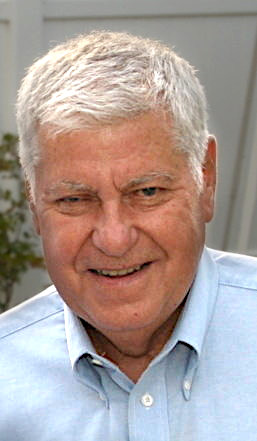
- In office 1969–1979

Personal details
- Born: Jerry Dale Roe; 1936 (age 89–90) Havre, Montana, U.S.
- Party: Republican
- Education: University of Great Falls
- Occupation: Executive director Michigan Republican Party

Jerry D. Roe (born 1936) finished his career as an adjunct professor at Lansing Community College and is best known for his 10-year stint from 1969 to 1979 as the executive director of the Michigan Republican Party. Roe is sometimes called "Mr. Republican" and was declared a Michiganian of the Year by the Detroit News in 1986. He is the father of Jason Roe, former chief of staff to United States Representative Tom Feeney and former deputy campaign manager of the 2008 presidential primary campaign of Mitt Romney.

== Early life ==
Roe was born in 1936, the son of Howard and Ialene Roe, and graduated from Havre High School, Havre, Montana, in 1954, then went on to graduate from the University of Great Falls in 1958.

== Early political involvement ==
While at Great Falls, Roe was the president of the university's Republican Club, the chairman of the Cascade County Young Republicans, and the chairman of the Montana Federation of Young Republican Clubs. His formative years in Montana coincided with his developing Republican ideology. "I decided around that time to become a Republican because it seemed to me from reading history that the GOP was much stronger on foreign policy matters," Roe said. He was District Representative to Michigan Congressman Garry E. Brown from 1967 until 1969.

== Executive director of the Michigan Republican Party ==
Roe served as executive director of the Michigan Republican Party from 1969 until 1979. During this period, Roe earned respect from leaders of both political parties, as evidenced by his appointment to the Michigan Historical Commission by both Republican governor William G. Milliken and Democratic governor James J. Blanchard.

When Roe stepped down as state Republican leader in 1979, his passion for candid commentary was widely remembered. "The GOP will become history if we don't win some elections," Roe told the Michigan press corps. Comments like that, one newspaper reported, qualified the outgoing GOP executive director as "one of the most colorful -- and controversial -- figures in state Republican circles." At Roe's departure from the Michigan GOP in 1979, he faced criticism that he marshaled GOP resources to gubernatorial and U.S. Senate candidates at the expense of local candidates. "I'm a Republican's Republican," Roe said. "I don't care if we have liberals or conservatives as long as we win."

== Political strategist ==
A noted political strategist, Roe has been tapped by reporters and candidates for analysis and strategy. Roe resurrected the campaign Whistle-Stop Tour, reminiscent of President Truman's come-from-behind victory in 1948, for President Gerald Ford's fledgling 1976 May primary campaign in Michigan against fellow Republican Ronald Reagan. "While Roe insists the 166-mile train ride was only a part of the reason for Ford's almost 2-1 trouncing of Californian Ronald Reagan, others say it was a key factor in the race." The engine that led the President's procession was the Grand Trunk Western Railroad's "Screaming Eagle", a red, white and blue locomotive selected as the best train design by Roe, president of the Michigan Historical Commission, and two other judges for Michigan's 1976 celebration of the U.S. Bicentennial. Ford continued Roe's whistle-stop idea during the fall general-election campaign, but with less success than in Michigan's primary campaign. "President Ford, his campaign running dangerously low on steam, took a whistle-stop tour through Illinois yesterday." Ford won Illinois in the 1976 general election by a slight margin, but lost the national election 50.08 percent to 48.02 percent.

Responding to national media inquiries about narrowing poll numbers in Michigan during the 1976 campaign between Governor Jimmy Carter and Ford, Roe commented: "I'd rather be ahead at this point than behind. Michigan is very Democratic state and for Ford to still be ahead by two points, I think he's going to pull it off."

Roe was named a Michiganian of the Year by the Detroit News in 1986, along with former governor G. Mennen "Soapy" Williams and 12 other honorees that year who "helped make living in this state a richer experience for the rest of us, either by their good works or by the example they set."

Roe is often relied on as a Michigan GOP historian, and is associated with the moderate "Milliken Republicans", named for the former governor whose term in office spanned all of Roe's stint as GOP state director. "Even during his gubernatorial years, Milliken was not representative of his state party," said Roe of former Michigan Governor William G. Milliken. "When county party [GOP] chairs descended on Lansing to meet with Roe, he said, 'They would say things like, If that goddamned Millken doesn't shape up --' Then they'd go to a reception with him and tell him they loved him."

== Recent political involvement ==
Roe supported John McCain's Presidential run in 2000, as a member of his Michigan Steering Committee and would also support McCain during his 2004 election run where the Associated Press reported Roe's prediction of a 2008 McCain nomination: "'He's pretty well set to go in four years, [...] Politicians that go anyplace are like rock stars. McCain's a rock star.'"

Roe was an elected delegate to the Republican National Convention in 2004.

He was elected in August 2008 at Michigan Republican State Convention as Presidential Elector for John McCain in the 7th Congressional District.

Roe had been active with Michigan State Senator Rick Jones, District 24, since Jones' race for sheriff in 2000. He had served as Senator Jones' senior policy adviser.

== Personal life ==
He is the father of Jason Roe, a former chief of staff to United States Representative Tom Feeney and former deputy campaign manager of the 2008 presidential primary campaign of Mitt Romney; and Samantha Roe, formerly of the U.S. Chamber of Commerce. Jerry Roe died on August 26, 2018, of pneumonia. There was a memorial scheduled for March 8, 2019.

Roe was a political science professor at Lansing Community College in Lansing, Michigan.
