= Henry Crown Field House =

University of Chicago athletic facility

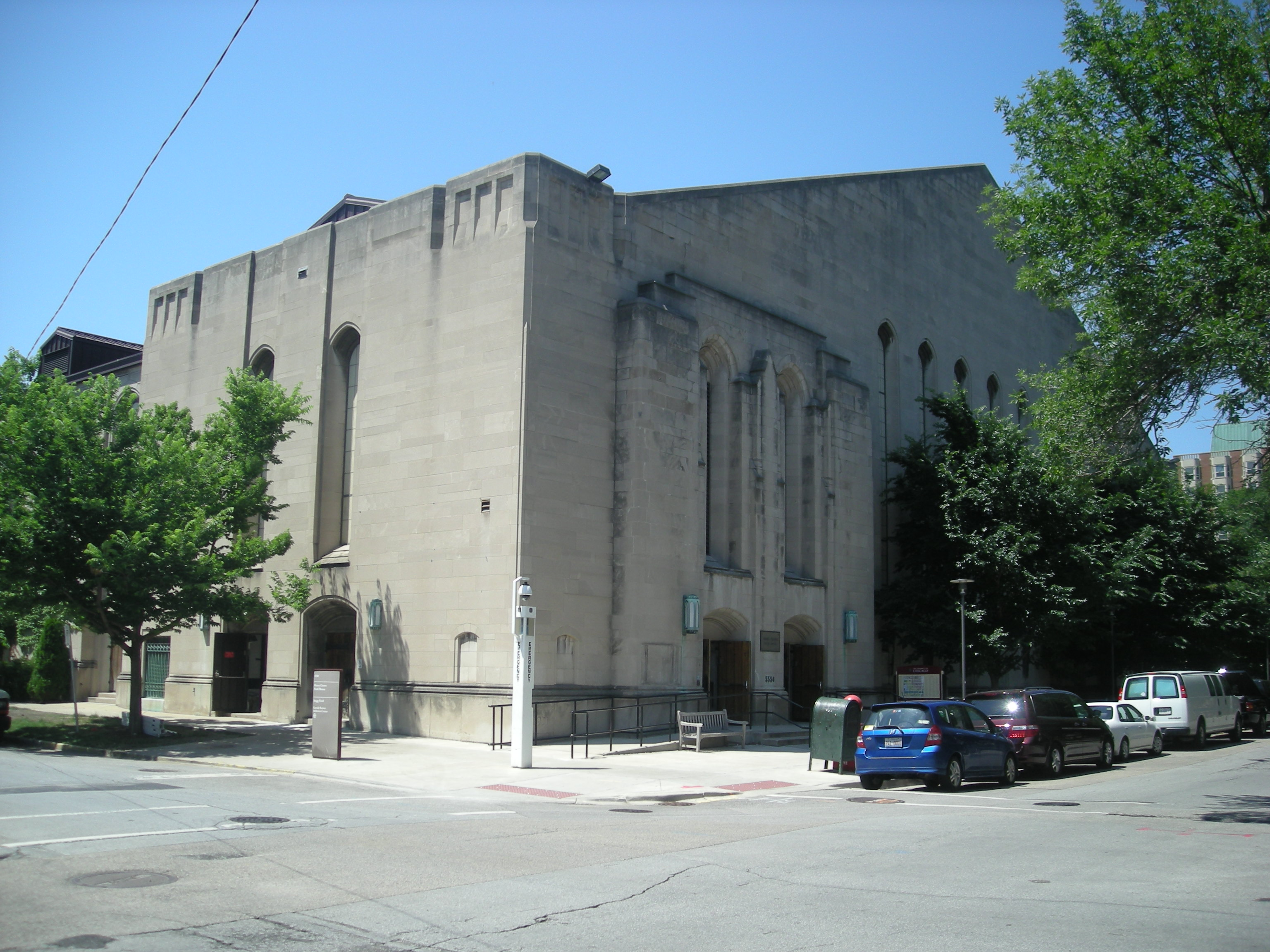
- Interactive map of Henry Crown Field House
- Location: 5550 South University Ave; Chicago, Illinois, United States
- Owner: University of Chicago
- Operator: University of Chicago
- Capacity: 3,500

Construction
- Groundbreaking: November 14, 1925
- Opened: December 25, 1931
- Cost: $700,000
- Architect: Holabird & Root

Tenants
- campus recreation center for students intramural and club sports programming

Henry Crown Field House is an athletic facility on the campus of the University of Chicago in Chicago, Illinois. Construction of the building took place in 1931 on land owned by the university. The cost of construction, however; was covered by Material Service Corporation's CEO and philanthropist, Henry Crown. Under the direction of architects Holabird & Root, the field house was built as a replacement for Bartlett Gymnasium to be the home of the Chicago Maroons men's basketball team, as well as an indoor practice facility with a dirt infield that was utilized for football and baseball practices. A track encircled the infield and a raised wood floor that was used for basketball. In 2003, the team moved into the newly built Gerald Ratner Athletics Center, and the building was remodeled to become a full-time intramural facility. The building also contains a fitness center with resistance and weight training equipment, a cardio hallway with 34 cardio machines (treadmills, ellipticals, rowers, steppers, step mills), a 200-metre (660 ft) indoor track, four multi-purpose courts for basketball, volleyball, indoor soccer, and tennis, an Astro-turfed multi-purpose room, five squash courts, and four racquetball/handball courts.

Upon its completion, the field house was located just north of the original Stagg Field, at University Avenue and 56th Street. The building measured 368 feet (112 m) long and 165 feet (50 m) wide. The interior was a single great arena with no obstructions. The height from the clay floor to the centerline of the trusses was 50 feet (15 m) feet. There was a 220-yard (200 m) track with a 100-yard (91 m) straightaway surrounding a raised wooden basketball floor measuring 110 by 62 feet (34 by 19 m). Removable bleachers gave a seating capacity of 3,500. There are locker rooms in the basement which provide accommodations for 500 athletes. The building utilized a Gothic design, with an exterior of Indiana limestone harmonizing with the other university buildings.
