= Gerald Ford (disambiguation) =

Gerald Ford (1913–2006) was the 38th president of the United States from 1974 to 1977.

Gerald, Gerry, or Jerry Ford may also refer to:

== People ==
- Gerald J. Ford (born 1944), American attorney and businessman
- Gerald Rudolff Ford (1890–1962), American businessman and politician, namesake stepfather of the 38th president
- Gerard W. Ford (1924–2008), American businessman who started Ford Modelling Agency
- Gerry Ford (businessman) (born 1957), London-based American businessman, founder of Caffè Nero

== Places ==
=== Named for the 38th president ===
- Gerald R. Ford International Airport, Grand Rapids, Michigan
- Gerald R. Ford School of Public Policy, University of Michigan
- Gerald R. Ford Presidential Library, University of Michigan
- Gerald R. Ford Presidential Museum, Grand Rapids, Michigan
- President Gerald R. Ford Jr. Boyhood Home, Grand Rapids, Michigan

=== Other ===
- Gerald J. Ford Stadium, in Dallas, Texas, named for the attorney and businessman

== Other uses ==
- USS Gerald R. Ford, a 2013 supercarrier named for the 38th president
  - Gerald R. Ford-class aircraft carrier, named for the lead ship
- Jerry Ford Invitational, a celebrity pro-am golf tournament run from 1977 to 1996
