= Gerald Ratner Athletics Center =

Sports complex at University of Chicago, U.S.

Ratner Athletics Center
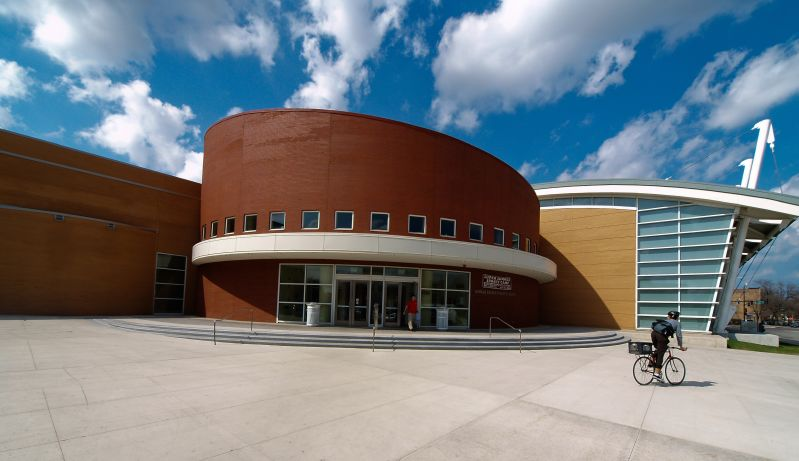

- Location in Chicago Location in Illinois Location in United States
- Full name: Gerald Ratner Athletics Center
- Location: 5530 South Ellis Avenue; Hyde Park, Chicago, Illinois 60637
- Coordinates: 41°47′38.87″N 87°36′6.48″W
- Owner: University of Chicago
- Field size: 150,000 square feet (14,000 m^{2})

Construction
- Groundbreaking: October 28, 2000 (ceremonial groundbreaking)
- Opened: September 29, 2003 (opened); October 11, 2003 (dedicated)
- Cost: $51 million
- Architect: Cesar Pelli
- Structural engineer: OWP/P Structures
- General contractors: Walsh Construction Company, Inc.,

Tenants
- University of Chicago men's basketball University of Chicago women's basketball University of Chicago men's volleyball University of Chicago women's volleyball University of Chicago wrestling University of Chicago men's swimming & diving University of Chicago women's swimming & diving University of Chicago Athletics Department

The Gerald Ratner Athletics Center (colloquially, the Rat) is a $51 million athletics facility within the University of Chicago campus in the Hyde Park community area on the South Side of Chicago, Illinois in the United States. The building was named after University of Chicago alumnus Gerald Ratner. The architect of this suspension structure that is supported by masts, cables and counterweights was César Pelli, who is best known as the architect of the Petronas Towers.

The Ratner Athletics Center was approved for use in September 2003. The facility includes, among other things: a competition gymnasium, a multilevel fitness facility, an Olympic-sized swimming pool, a multipurpose dance studio, meeting room space, and athletic department offices. It serves as home to several of the university's athletic teams and has hosted numerous National Collegiate Athletic Association Division III regional and University Athletic Association conference championship events.

Located at the southwest corner of Ellis Avenue and 55th Street, the Ratner Center has an award-winning design that uses a complex external mast-and-counterweight system instead of interior support devices, allowing for large open-space areas inside the building. Cesar Pelli & Associates Inc. was credited as the design architect and OWP/P was the architect of record.

== History ==
A ceremonial groundbreaking was held for the Ratner Center on October 28, 2000. The Ratner Center opened to the public on September 29, 2003, although it was not officially dedicated until homecoming weekend on October 11. The building, which represented a collaboration between Cesar Pelli & Associates and Chicago's OWP/P, was the first new athletic facility on the University of Chicago campus in 68 years. It was a part of a $500 million University-wide capital improvement plan that occurred between 1999 and 2005. Part of the plan included the Pelli-designed parking structure across the street from the Athletics Center. The parking structure is named the Gerald Ratner Athletics Center Parking Structure. The athletic center is known for its innovative asymmetrically supported cable-stayed structural system and S-shaped roofs. It is composed of a masted building to the north containing the Myers-McLoraine Swimming Pool, a masted building to the south containing the gymnasia, and a central building containing the Bernard DelGiorno fitness center.

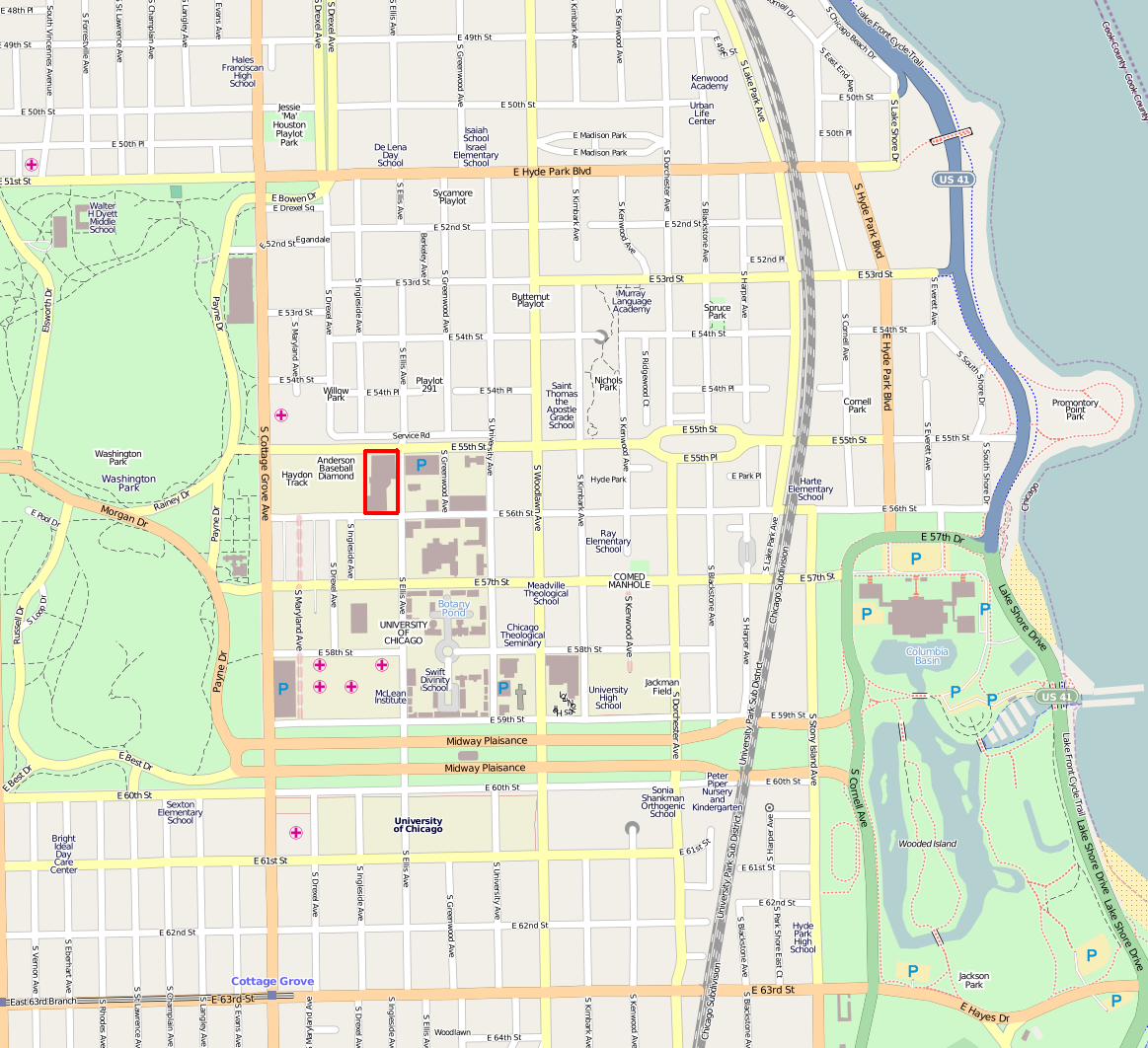
Map of Ratner Center on the University of Chicago campus

Ratner, Ph.B.,’35, J.D.,’37, contributed $15 million toward the $51 million cost. He was a Phi Beta Kappa graduate and played for the baseball team during the time that the university participated in the Big Ten Conference. After graduating from the law school, Order of the Coif, he eventually founded his own law firm Gould & Ratner in 1949. Helen Myers McLoraine, also an alumnus from the 1930s, contributed in excess of $5 million to fund the swimming pool. Bernard DelGiorno — a gymnast with many degrees from the university: AB’54, AB’55, MBA’55 — has made numerous donations including a $5 million one in 2006 to fund athletic facilities as well as other infrastructure on campus. DelGiorno worked in industrial relations and personnel at a steel plant before working for Paine Webber, which became a part of UBS Financial Services.

== Details ==
The building features the 50-metre (54.7 yd) x 25-metre (27.3 yd) Myers-McLoraine Swimming Pool, which can be configured with up to 20 lanes in the 25-yard dimension and nine lanes in the 50-meter dimension. The pool's configuration is flexible with a moveable bulkhead which allows for simultaneous activities. It also has a pair of one-meter diving boards. The pool depth ranges from 4 to 13.5 feet (1.2 to 4.1 m) in the shallow end and the diving well, respectively. The 24,700-square-foot (2,295 m^{2}) competition natatorium features seating for 350 spectators.

The building also includes the Bernard DelGiorno fitness center. The DelGiorno Fitness Center facility occupies two levels of the Ratner center plus the rotunda area. In addition to a general fitness center, it includes a multipurpose dance studio; classroom and meeting room space; permanent and day lockers and locker rooms; the University of Chicago Athletics Hall of Fame; and the athletic department offices.

The building also features a competition gym and auxiliary gym, both of which are available to recreational users. The competition gym, which is the southernmost building, accommodates practice and game site for varsity basketball, volleyball, and wrestling, but is convertible into two recreational courts. The auxiliary gym is multipurpose and can accommodate indoor soccer, as well as basketball, volleyball, and badminton.

== Use ==
The Ratner Center also serves as the home of the University of Chicago basketball, volleyball, and wrestling teams. The 1,658-seat competition gymnasium has played host to the 2004, 2007 and 2010 University Athletic Association Wrestling Championships and the 2006 NCAA Division III Great Lakes Regional Wrestling Championship. The building also hosted the 2009 University Athletic Association Women's Volleyball Championship. The Myers-McLoraine Swimming Pool was the site of the 2005 University Athletic Association Swimming and Diving Championship. It also hosted swimming at the 2006 Gay Games.

The center is available to university and hospital faculty, staff, alumni, and retirees as well as their spouses and children on a paid membership basis and registered students for free. The facilities memberships are available to students as well as University and hospital faculty, staff, alumni and retirees, as well as spouses and children. Registered students' memberships are free.

The building is complemented at the university by its predecessors the Henry Crown Field House and the modern incarnation of Stagg Field, which will continue to augment the athletic facilities needs of the campus patrons. Features of the indoor Henry Crown Field House include a 200-meter indoor running track; racquetball, handball and squash courts; multipurpose courts; a multipurpose room; and cardiovascular and weight training equipment. The Stagg Field outdoor complex includes a 400-meter track, eight tennis courts, and fields for baseball, softball, American football and soccer.

== Design ==
Ratner Center's Myers-McLoraine Swimming Pool
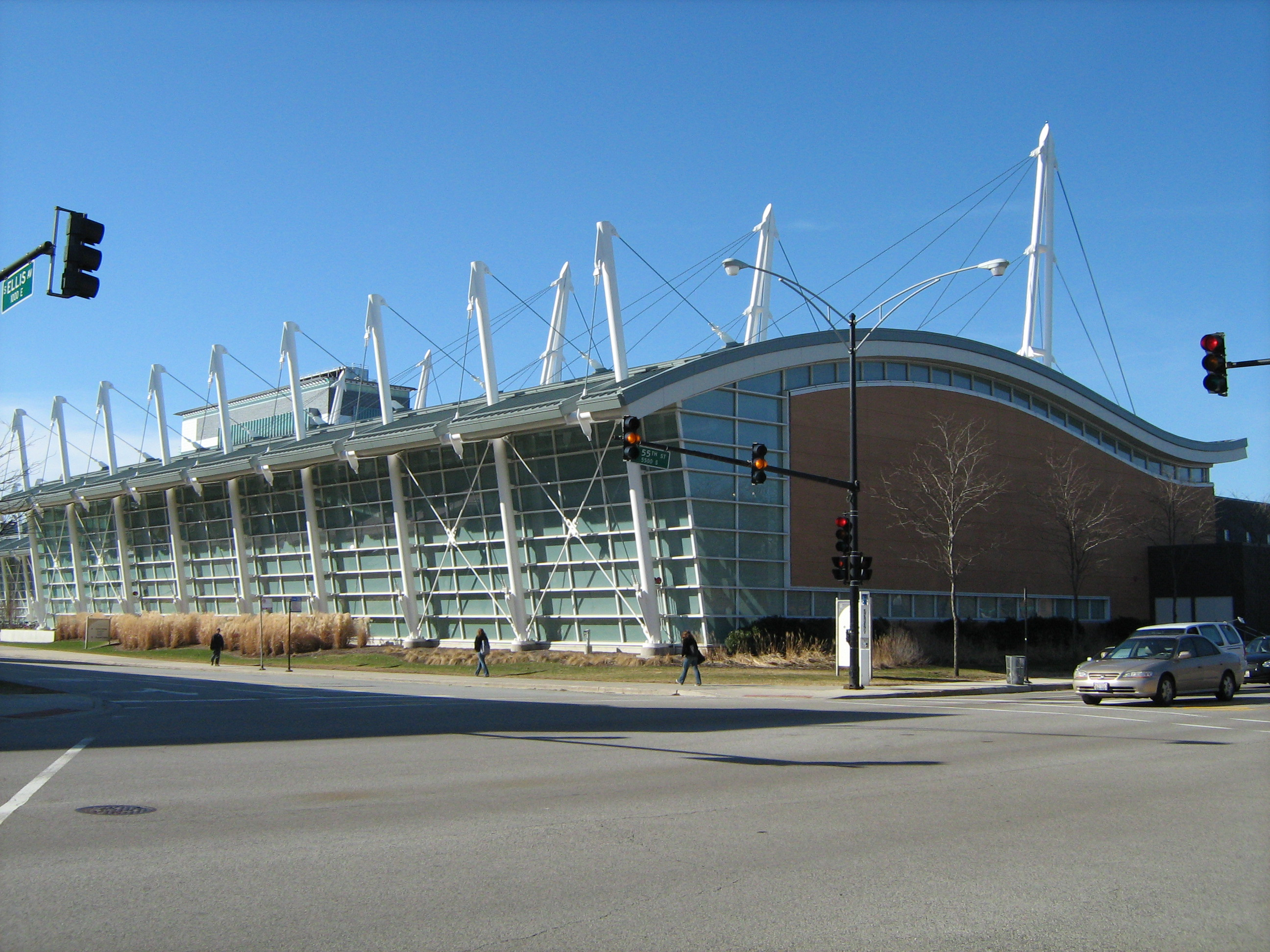
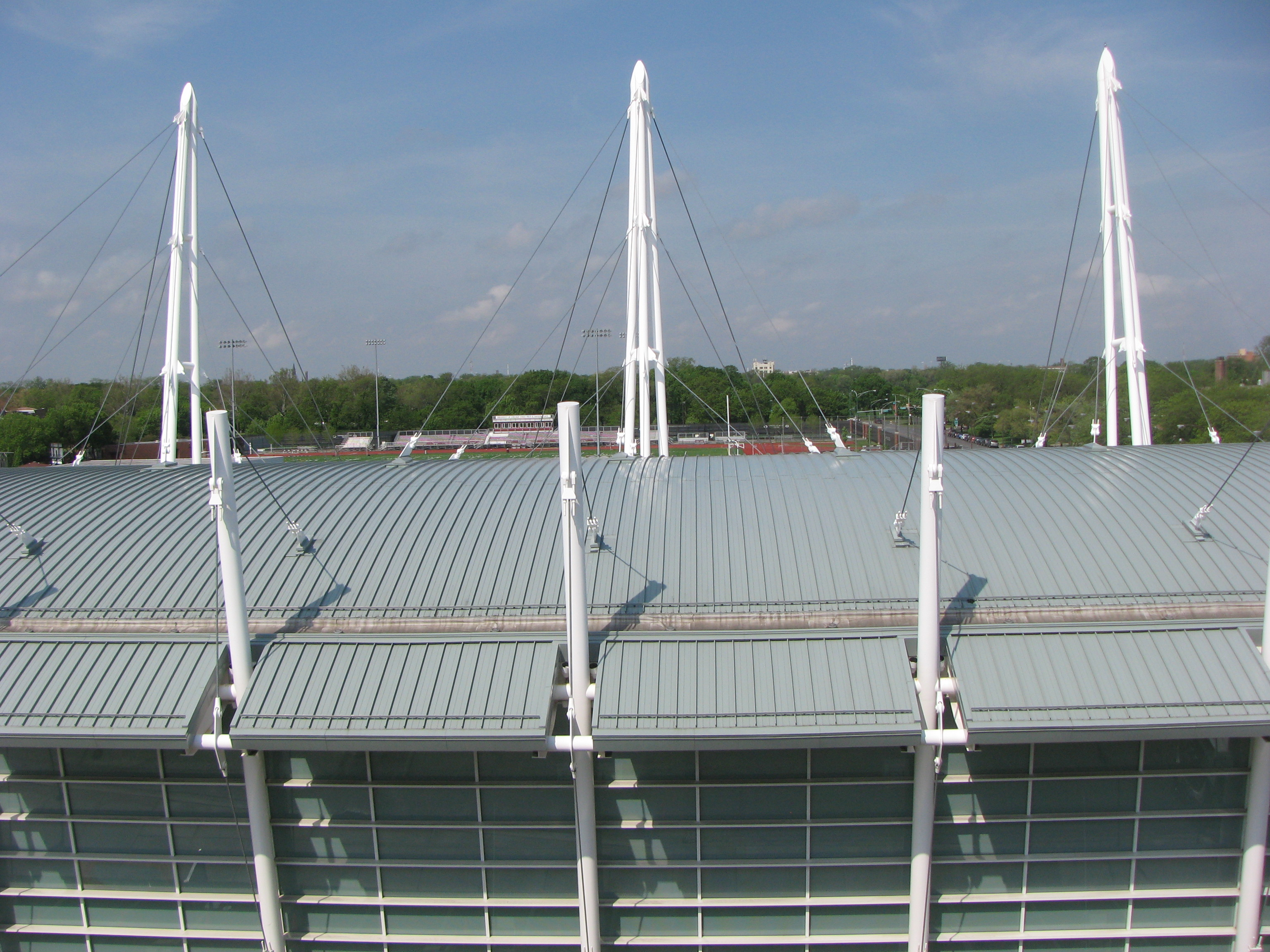

The construction employed 2,000 short tons (1,814 t; 1,786 long tons) of steel. The 2,000,000-pound (907,185 kg) roof of the gym is supported by a pair of 125-foot (38 m) steel masts. The pool's roof is supported by three masts. Each mast is composed of three 18-inch (46 cm) diameter steel hollow structural sections (HSS) filled with high-strength concrete that are arranged in a tapered tied-column configuration.

The German-import masts are united by 120 high-strength steel cables that total approximately 6,500 feet (1,981 m) in length. They are inclined at a 10 degree angle from vertical. Each tapered composite mast that supports the flattened S-shaped roof girders is supported by 15 splaying cables; 9 fore-stay cables and 6 backstay cables. During construction, the masts were filled with 10,000 pounds per square inch (69,000,000 Pa) cast-in-place concrete using innovative pumping techniques.

Concrete counterweights totaling 2,500 cubic yards (1,911 m^{3}) — with some as large as 50 by 25 by 13 feet (15.2 by 7.6 by 4.0 m) — counteract the weight of the roof from below the ground. The masts and counterweights are likened as external form-giving elements to flying buttresses in gothic architecture, which predominates the campus' architecture. The building is said to interpret gothic architecture through structural expressionism. The exterior support design made the interior space more receptive to open natural lighting and more accommodating for free movement.

Ratner Center gymnasium
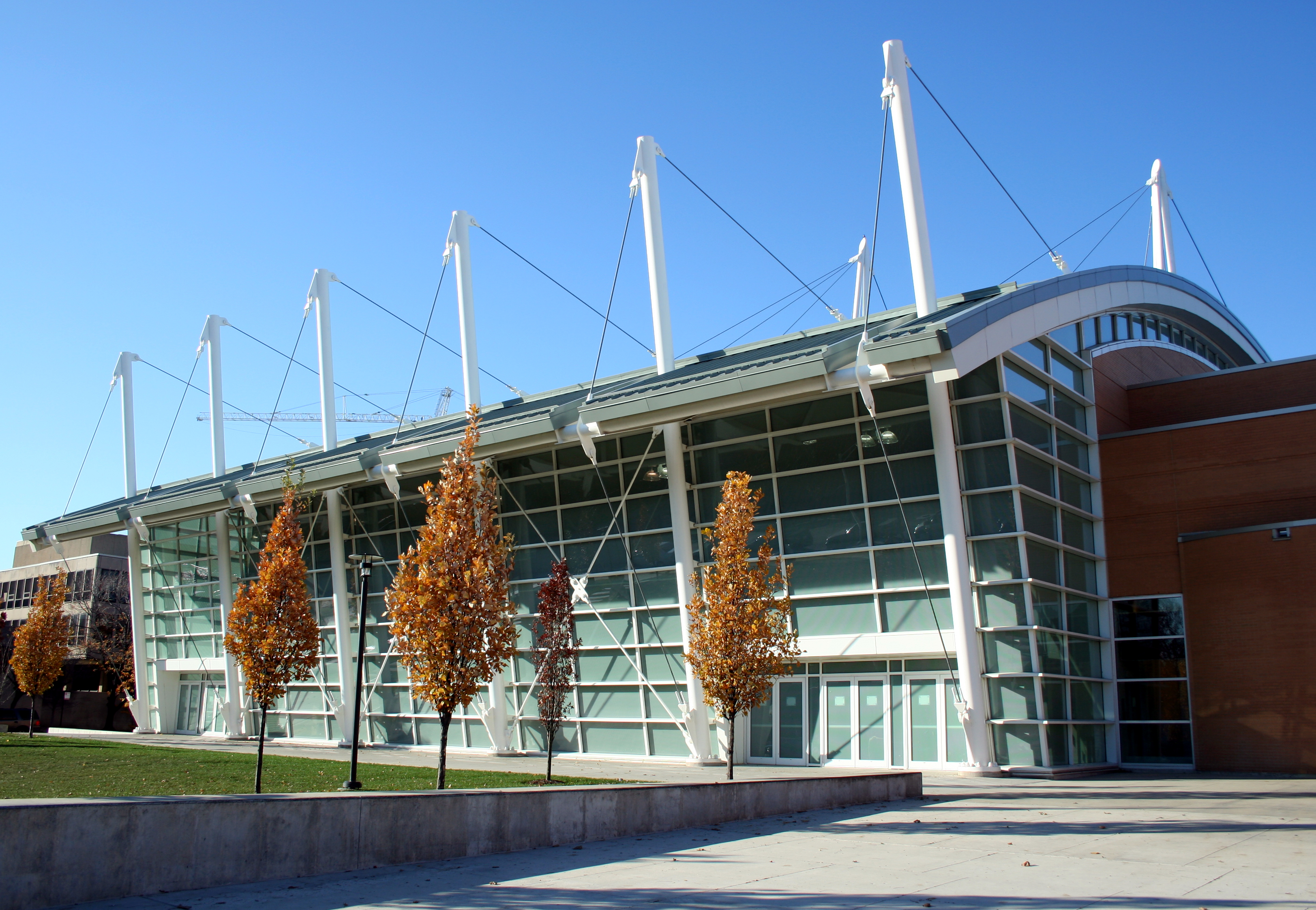
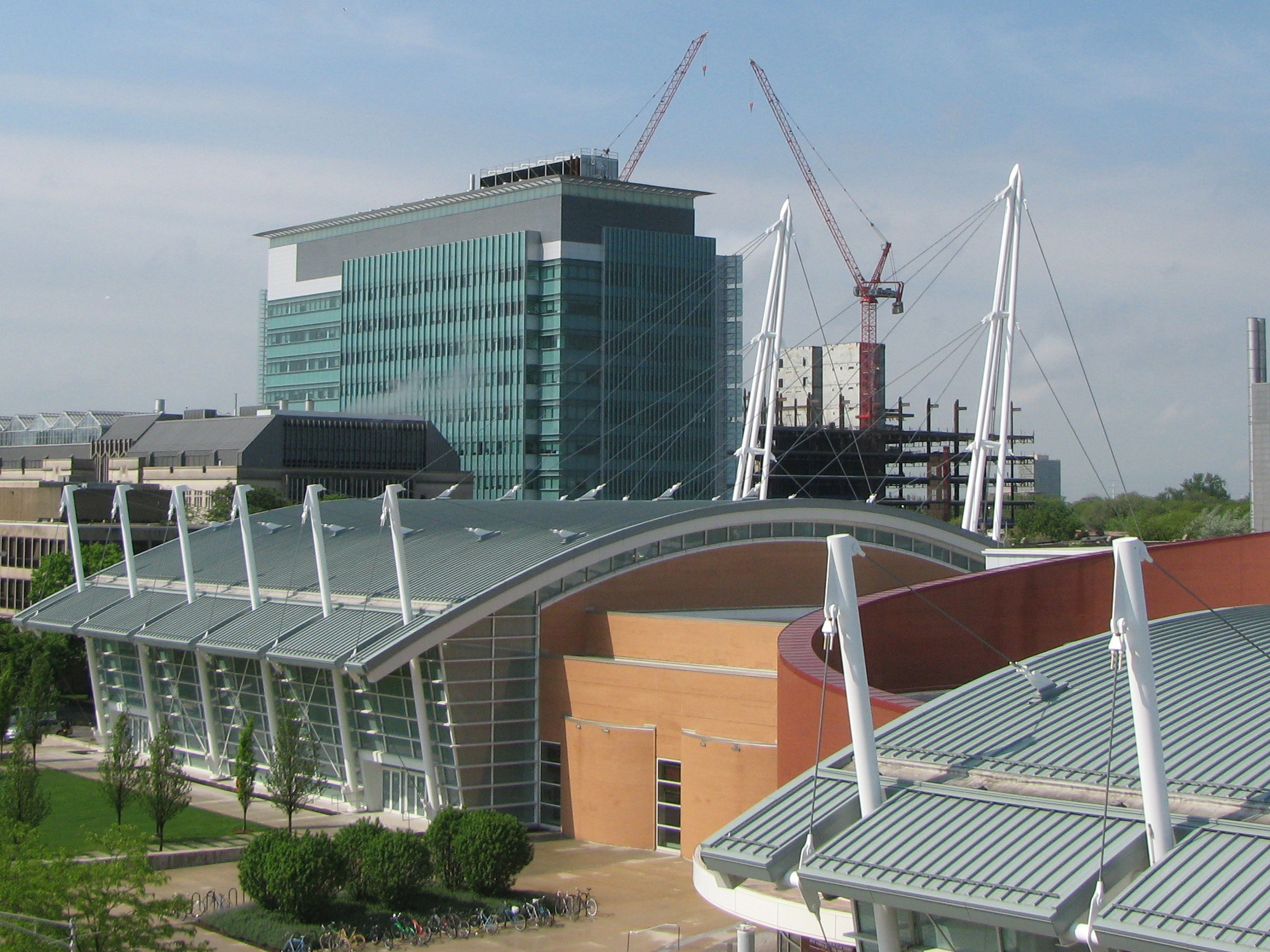

The roof design incorporated multi-level splayed cables so that the structural roof members could form a 33-inch (83.8 cm) deep uniformly curved roof plane. The roof members are curved and shallow. They support 7 2-inch (5.1 cm) thick 25-foot (7.6 m) metal roof deck spans between the roof girders. The W33x169 girders are cold bent with reverse curves to multiple radii. The curved roof planes are suspended from German "full-lock" steel cables and include three outer layers of interlocking Z-shaped wires designed to minimize water infiltration and corrosion.

The engineering of the masts was complicated because stability was so important to the overall design success of the suspension structure. Mast displacements could significantly alter cable length and tension and redistribute loads through the superstructure contrary to design. The key to successful design was control of the foundation settlement. The sites natural underlying subsurface conditions were stiff silty clay below a medium dense sand layer, which was determined to be too accommodating to settlement to host the structure. Ground improvement, consisting of triple-fluid jet grouting, was performed to reduce the compressibility of the silty clay, stiffen the sand deposit and provide a desirable shallow foundation system. This site marked the first time that these geotechnical ground improvement techniques were employed.

== Reception ==
The facility's engineering and design has earned it awards from the American Council of Engineering Companies, the American Institute of Steel Construction, and the Consulting Engineers Council of Illinois. The building earned a Merit Award in the category of new buildings in the $30 million and over category in the National Council of Structural Engineers Associations 2004 Excellence in Structural Engineering Awards program. The building earned the 2003 Outstanding Civil Engineering Achievement of the Year award by the American Society of Civil Engineers and the 2004 Project of the Year Overall by Midwest Construction News.

== Heisman Trophy ==
The very first Heisman Trophy, awarded to University of Chicago star halfback Jay Berwanger, sits in the Ratner Center.
