= Jerry Hinsdale =

American swimmer and coach

Jerry Walter Hinsdale
Biographical details
- Born: October 17, 1936 (age 90); Sacramento, California, U.S.
- Education: University of California, Davis 1959

Playing career
- 1955-1959: University of California, Davis
- Positions: football halfback, baseball

Coaching career (HC unless noted)
- 1961-1994: University of California, Davis; Davis AAU Aquadarts; UC Davis Swimming; UC Davis Water Polo

Jerry W. Hinsdale (born October 17, 1936) was an American competitive swimmer for the University of California, Davis and a swimming and water polo coach for U.C. Davis serving over 30 years from 1961 to 1994. He led his water polo teams to several Far Western Conference titles and postseason NCAA appearances through the 1970s and 1980s.

== Education and swimming ==
Born on October 17, 1936, in Sacramento, California to Elmer George and Mona Delores Ruhe, he attended Clarksburg High School. As a youth, he played High School basketball, was a football halfback, competed in tennis, and was made a Troop 83 Eagle Scout for his cooking, pioneering and camping skills. Active in leadership roles, he was elected Student Body Vice-president of Clarksburg High for the 1953–4 school year, and then served as president as a Senior.

Hinsdale attended U.C. Davis from 1954 to 1959, where he was a member of Theta Chi fraternity, and lettered in baseball, and as a halfback for the football team. He majored in Physical Education.

== Coaching ==
He was best known for coaching the University of California Davis swimming and Water Polo Teams from 1961 to 1994. Excelling as a coach early in his tenure at UC Davis, his 1963 Water Polo team had 12 straight wins, and he led his water polo teams to several Far Western Conference titles and postseason NCAA appearances. As a Division II school, UC Davis swimmers faced extreme competition from outstanding swimmers from California area college's Division I schools like Stanford's Dave Bottom, and U.C. Berkeley's Matt Biondi in 1986. Hinsdale remarked that "swimming against a record holder is like a musician playing with the best in the world. Until you actually do it, you don't know how far you can go". Hinsdale's team performed well under the pressure.

=== Outstanding athletes ===
Hinsdale coached Dave Scott as a UC Davis swimmer and water polo player, who later became one of the best-known world class triathletes in the 1980s, winning six Iron Man Triathlons. Scott also helped coach the Davis Aquadart Swimming club.

=== Roles outside coaching ===
Hinsdale served as Chairman of the National Collegiate Athletic Association (NCAA) Water Polo Rules committee. He led and managed national clinics for the Pan American Games known as the Union Nacional de Entrenadores de Natacion in Barquisimeto, Venezuela, in 1983. He was a supervisor for officials that represented Venezuela at the 1983 Pan American Games, in Caracas in 1983. He helped conduct both American and international clinics, and was an Organizing committee member for the 1984 Olympic Games, and the 1983 FINA Cup.

At 28, Jerry married Jane Martha Abott Hinsdale, also of Sacramento on June 20, 1965, and they had two children. They were avid sailors in their retirement, sailing frequently in Mexico. Jerry moved from the Davis area, forty miles South to Isleton, California after his wife Jane's death in 2019.

=== Honors ===
Hinsdale was made a member of the "100 Greatest Coaches of the Century" by the College Swimming Coaches Association of American (CSCAA) Centennial Committee.
