= Jerald Posman =

- Employer: City College of New York
- Title: Vice President

Jerald Posman is Vice President for Administration and Finance at the City College of New York, a senior college of the City University of New York. Prior to that, he served most recently as Senior Vice President and Chief Operating Officer for six and a half years at York College, City University of New York. He received his undergraduate degree in English literature from the City College of New York and MBA from the Harvard Business School.

== Career ==
Posman has worked and lived overseas, including five years in the Peace Corps as a volunteer teacher in Tunisia and as a staff member in Sri Lanka. He has been in charge of operations as Deputy Chancellor of the New York City School System. Posman was also the Vice Chancellor for Budget and Finance at the City University of New York from 1977 to 1984.

Several years ago Posman helped develop entrepreneurial opportunities and support structures for populations in New York City that would not otherwise become involved in small business. He is a board member of a micro enterprise organization–Project Enterprise–developed on the Grameen Bank model—which was founded by Muhammad Yunus, the father of micro-credit movement. With the help of Dr. Marcia Keizs, President of York College, Posman took an initiative along with Rashidul Bari, a Biographer of Muhammad Yunus, to start Muhammad Yunus Scholarship

On February 11, 2008, Yunus came to York College to mark the establishment of Scholarship Program. At the event CUNY Executive Vice Chancellor and University Provost, Dr. Selma Botman awarded Yunus with Chancellor’s Medal for his humanitarian efforts. Posman also wrote the foreword for Muhammad Yunus' biography," Grameen Social Business Model: A Manifesto for Proletariat Revolution", written by Rashidul Bari. Posman also has appeared in a film, The Killing of Muhammad Yunus’ Biographer.

Posman lives in New York City with his wife and daughter.
