= Géraud =

Géraud is a given name. Notable people with the name include:

- Géraud-Pierre-Henri-Julien Bessières (1777–1840), French scientist and diplomat
- Géraud de Cordemoy (1626–1684), French philosopher, historian and lawyer
- Géraud Duroc (1772–1813), French general noted for his association with Napoleon
- Pierre Géraud-Keraod (1917–1997), one of the founders of the Bleimor Scouting movement in 1946
- Géraud Michel de Pierredon (1916–2006), the Ambassador of the Order of Malta to France
- Géraud du Puy (died 1420), French Roman Catholic bishop of Montauban, Saint-Flour, Mende and Carcassonne
- Géraud Réveilhac (1851–1937), French career officer, Général de division during World War I
- Jules-Géraud Saliège (1870–1956), French Cardinal of the Roman Catholic Church
- Géraud Sénizergues (born 1957), French computer scientist at the University of Bordeaux

== See also ==
- La Chapelle-Saint-Géraud, commune in the Corrèze department in central France
- Saint-Géraud, commune in the Lot-et-Garonne department in south-western France
- Saint-Géraud-de-Corps, commune in the Dordogne department in Aquitaine in southwestern France
- Gérard given name page
