= Jeri =

Jeri is a surname and given name. Notable people with the name include:

== Given name ==
- Jeri Campbell (born 1970), American figure skater
- Jeralita (Jeri) Costa (born 1959), American politician
- Jeri Ellsworth (born 1974), American entrepreneur and computer chip designer
- Jeri Laber (born 1931), American activist and writer
- Jeri Redcorn (born 1939), Oklahoman pottery artist
- Jeri Ryan (born 1968), American actress
- Jeri Sitzes (born 1979), American boxer, kickboxer and Muay Thai fighter
- Jeri Southern (1926–1991), American jazz pianist and singer born Genevieve Hering
- Jeri Taylor (1938–2024), American television scriptwriter
- Jeri Kehn Thompson (born 1966), American radio host

== Surname ==
- José Jerí (born 1986), 65th President of Peru
- Vanessa Jeri (born 1980), Peruvian comedic actress

== Fictional characters ==
- Jeri Hogarth, Marvel Comics character
- Jeri Katou, a character in the television series Digimon Tamers
- 'Jeri', the portmanteau given to Hollyoaks characters Juliet Nightingale and Peri Lomax

== See also ==
- Jeri or Jheri curl, a hairstyle popular in the 1980s and '90s
- Jerry (name)
- Jèrri, the name of Jersey in the local Jèrriais language
