= Gery =

Géry is the customary French form of Saint Gaugericus.

French communes named for the saint include:

- Géry, Meuse, France
- Saint-Géry (disambiguation), several French communes
- Saint-Géry Island, former island in Brussels, Belgium

People with the surname Gery or Géry:

- Jacques Géry (1917–2007), French ichthyologist
- Jean Gery (also spelled Jean Jarry, Yan Jarri or Jean Henri) (before 1638–1690, French explorer
- Marcel Gery (born 1965), Slovakian and Canadian swimmer
- Wade-Gery:
  - Laura Wade-Gery (born 1965), British business executive
  - Sir Robert Wade-Gery (1929–2015), British diplomat
  - Theodore Wade-Gery (1888–1972), British classical scholar, historian and epigrapher

Gery and Géry are also male given names, including:

- Géry de Ghersem (also Géry Gersem) (1573/75–1630), Franco-Flemish composer

== See also ==
- Geri (disambiguation)
- Gerri (disambiguation)
- Gerry (disambiguation)
