= Jerry =

Jerry may refer to:

== Animals ==
- Jerry (Grand National winner), racehorse, winner of the 1840 Grand National
- Jerry (St Leger winner), racehorse, winner of 1824 St Leger Stakes

== Arts, entertainment, and media ==
- Jerry (play), a 1914 American play
- "Jerry", a song from the album Young and Free by Rock Goddess
- "Jerry" (Adventure Time: Fionna and Cake), an episode of the animated television series Adventure Time: Fionna and Cake
- Tom and Jerry (disambiguation)
  - Jerry Mouse
- Jerry (The Walking Dead), a character from The Walking Dead

== People ==
- Jerry (given name), including a list of people and fictional characters with the name
- Harold A. Jerry, Jr. (1920–2001), New York politician
- Thomas Jeremiah (d. 1775), commonly known simply as "Jerry", a free Negro in colonial South Carolina
- Tyson Jerry (born 1983), a Canadian Guinness World Record holder
- Jerry (born 1964), one half of the Indian filmmaking duo J. D.–Jerry

== Places ==
- Branche à Jerry, a tributary of the Baker River in Quebec and New Brunswick, Canada

== Other uses ==
- Jerry (company)
- Jerry (WWII), Allied nickname for Germans, originally from WWI but widely used in World War II
- Jerry Rescue (1851), involving American slave William Henry, who called himself "Jerry"
- Jerry, a chamberpot in British slang usage
- List of storms named Jerry, various tropical cyclones having the name
- Jalebi, also jerry, an Indian and Middle Eastern sweet

== See also ==
- Jery (disambiguation)
- Geri (disambiguation)
- Gerry, a given name and surname
- Jeri, a given name and surname
- Jèrri, the name of Jersey in the local language Jèrriais
- Jerrycan, a robust fuel container made from pressed steel
- Jerry's (disambiguation)
