= Geri =

Geri or GERI may refer to:

== Places ==
=== Villages in Iran ===
- Geri, Iran
- Deraz Geri
- Geri Doveji
- Khvajeh Geri

=== Elsewhere ===
- Geri, Cyprus, a village
- Geri, Georgia, a village in Georgia
- Geri route, a set of streets in Chandigarh, India

== People with the name ==
- Geri (given name)
- Geri (surname)

== Arts, entertainment, and media ==
- Geri, a wolf in Norse mythology from the story "Geri and Freki"
- Geri Reig, a 1980 album by German band Der Plan
- Geri's Game, a 1997 short film by Pixar

== Other uses ==
- Geri, a Somali word for giraffe
- Geri's Hamburgers, a defunct fast food restaurant chain in the United States
- Mawashi geri, a kick in Japanese martial arts
- Gery (disambiguation)
- Gerri (disambiguation)
- Gerry (disambiguation)
