= Wade-Gery =

Wade-Gery is a British surname. People with the name include:

- Laura Wade-Gery (born 1965), British business executive
- Sir Robert Wade-Gery (1929–2015), British diplomat
- Theodore Wade-Gery (1888–1972), British classical scholar, historian and epigrapher

== See also ==
- Wade (surname)
- Gery (disambiguation)
