= Tyson =

Tyson is an English male given name of old French origin meaning 'high-spirited', 'fire'. It is from this that a surname arose 'son of Tyson'.

== Surname ==
- Alan Tyson (1926–2000), British musicologist
- Barbara Tyson (born 1964), Canadian actress
- Bill Tyson, Irish writer and producer
- Cade Tyson (born 2003), American basketball player
- Cathy Tyson (born 1965), British actress
- Charles Tyson (1885–1964), English footballer
- Cicely Tyson (1924–2021), American actress
- Donald J. Tyson (1930–2011), American business executive and billionaire
- Edward Tyson (1650–1708), English scientist and physician
- Frank Tyson (1930–2015), English cricketer
- Grace Tyson (1881–1941), American Vaudeville performer and actress
- Ian Tyson (1933–2022), Canadian singer-songwriter
- Isaac Tyson (1792–1861), American mining industrialist
- Jacob Tyson (1773–1848), American politician
- James Tyson (1819–1898), Australian pastoralist
- J. Anthony Tyson (born 1940), American physicist and astronomer
- Jaylon Tyson (born 2002), American basketball player
- Job Roberts Tyson (1803–1858), U.S. Congressman
- John M. Tyson (born 1953), American judge
- John W. Tyson (1905–1967), American founder of Tyson Foods
- Jordyn Tyson (born 2004), American football player
- June Tyson (1936–1992), American jazz singer
- Keith Tyson (born 1969), British artist
- Laura Tyson (born 1947), American economist and presidential adviser
- Liam Tyson (born 1969), British guitarist
- Lawrence Tyson (1861–1929), American politician
- Mike Tyson (born 1966), American boxer and former undisputed heavyweight champion of the world
- Mike Tyson (baseball) (born 1950), American baseball player
- Mike Tyson (American football) (born 1993), American football player
- Mildred Lund Tyson (1895–1989) American choral director, composer, organist and soprano
- Nathan Tyson (born 1982), English football player
- Neil deGrasse Tyson (born 1958), American astrophysicist
- Paul Tyson (1886–1950), American football coach
- Richard Tyson (born 1956), American actor
- Ron Tyson (born 1948), American singer
- Sarah Tyson Rorer (1849–1937), American writer
- Stuart Tyson Smith, American Egyptologist
- Sylvia Tyson (born 1940), Canadian musician
- Tiger Tyson (born 1977), American pornographic actor
- Timothy Tyson (born 1959), American historian
- Turkey Tyson (1914–2000), American baseball player
- Ty Tyson (1888–1968), American sports broadcaster
- Vanessa C. Tyson, American political scientist

== First name ==
- Tyson Alualu (born 1987), American football player
- Tyson Andrews (born 1990), Australian rugby league footballer
- Tyson Apostol (born 1979), American reality TV star
- Tyson Ballou (born 1976), American model
- Tyson Beckford (born 1970), American model
- Tyson Beukeboom (born 1991), Canadian rugby union footballer
- Tyson Barrie (born 1991), Canadian ice hockey player
- Tyson Brummett (1984–2020), American baseball player
- Tyson Bull (born 1993), Australian artistic gymnast
- Tyson Campbell (born 2000), American football player
- Tyson Carter (born 1998), American basketball player
- Tyson Chandler (born 1982), American basketball player
- Tyson Clabo (born 1981), American football player
- Tyson Cole (born 1970), American restaurateur
- Tyson Demos (born 1988), Australian basketball player
- Tyson Dux (born 1978), Canadian professional wrestler
- Tyson Edwards (born 1976), Australian football player
- Tyson Etienne (born 1999), American basketball player
- Tyson Farago (born 1991), Canadian soccer player
- Tyson Foerster (born 2002), Canadian ice hockey player
- Tyson Frizell (born 1991), Welsh rugby union footballer
- Tyson Fury (born 1988), British boxer
- Tyson Gay (born 1982), American sprinter
- Tyson Gillies (born 1988), Canadian baseball player
- Tyson Griffin (born 1984), American mixed martial artist
- Tyson Helton (born 1977), American football coach
- Tyson Hepburn, Canadian-American director
- Tyson Hergott (born 2001), Canadian football player
- Tyson Hesse, American comic book artist
- Tyson Houseman (born 1990), Canadian actor
- Tyson Jackson (born 1986), American football player
- Tyson Jerry (born 1983), Canadian photographer
- Tyson Jolly (born 1997), American basketball player
- Tyson Jost (born 1998), Canadian ice hockey player
- Tyson Keats (born 1981), New Zealand rugby union footballer
- Tyson Kidd (born 1980), Canadian professional wrestler
- Tyson Lane (born 1976), Australian rules footballer
- Tyson Larson (born 1986), American politician
- Tyson Lee (disambiguation), multiple people
- Tyson McGuffin (born 1989), American professional pickleball player
- Tyson Mao (born 1984), American Rubik's Cube solver
- Tyson Meade (born 1963), American musician
- Tyson Miller (born 1995), American baseball player
- Tyson Motsenbocker (born 1986), American songwriter
- Tyson Nam (born 1983), American mixed martial artist
- Tyson Nash (born 1975), Canadian ice hockey player
- Tyson Neighbors (born 2002), American baseball player
- Tyson Patterson (born 1978), American basketball player
- Tyson Pedro (born 1991), Australian mixed martial artist
- Tyson Pencer (born 1989), Canadian football player
- Tysson Poots (born 1988), American football player
- Tyson Ritter (born 1984), American singer-songwriter
- Tyson R. Roberts (born 1940), American ichthyologist
- Tyson Ross (born 1987), American baseball player
- Tyson Runningwolf, American politician
- Tyson Sexsmith (born 1989), Canadian ice hockey player
- Tyson Slattery (born 1990), Australian rules footballer
- Tyson Smith (disambiguation), multiple people
- Tyson Stengle (born 1998), Australian rules footballer
- Tyson Stenglein (born 1980), Australian rules footballer
- Tyson Sullivan (born 1986), American actor
- Tyson Summers (born 1980), American football coach
- Tyson Tan (born 1984), Chinese artist
- Tyson Thompson (born 1981), American football player
- Tyson Wahl (born 1984), American soccer player
- Tyson Walker (born 2000), American basketball player
- Tyson Walter (born 1978), American football player
- Tyson Wheeler (born 1975), American basketball player
- Ty'Son Williams (born 1996), American football player
- Tyson Yoshi (born 1994), Hong Kong rapper and hip hop artist

== Fictional characters ==
- Tyson, a rival of Ash Ketchum in the anime series Pokémon: Advanced Battle
- Tyson, fictional character in Percy Jackson & the Olympians
- Tyson Granger (Takao Kinomiya in Japanese version), protagonist from the anime series Beyblade
- Tyson Monroe, fictional character in the 2022 film Disenchanted
- Tyson Rios, fictional character in the video game Army of Two
- Kyla Tyson, fictional character in the television series Holby City
- Paul Tyson, a character played by Ted McGinley in the 2014 movie Reedemed

== See also ==
- Tison (disambiguation)
