= Gerić =

Gerić is a surname. Notable people with the surname include:

- Andrija Gerić (born 1977), Serbian volleyball player
- Dejan Gerić (born 1988), Slovenian footballer
- Dragoslava Gerić (1947–2011), Serbian and Yugoslavian basketball player

== See also ==
- Geri (surname)
- Gerig
