= From Dusk to Dub =

Studio album by Blackburner
- Released: June 24, 2014
- Genre: Dubstep; electronic; dance; trap
- Length: 1:13:28
- Label: Hypnotic; Cleopatra

Blackburner chronology
| Drop Bass Now Bombs (2013) | From Dusk to Dub (2014) | Dog Eats Rabbit (2017) |

From Dusk to Dub is the fifth studio album by American electro dubstep duo Blackburner and the follow-up to Drop Bass Not Bombs.

== Track listing ==
=== Disc 1 ===
| No. | Title | Length |
|---|---|---|
| 1. | "Butterfly Ghost" | 4:06 |
| 2. | "Hotel Bitches" | 3:45 |
| 3. | "Good Day in Hell" | 3:49 |
| 4. | "All Night Rave" | 4:03 |
| 5. | "Storm Booster" | 3:16 |
| 6. | "The Devil's Balls" | 3:48 |
| 7. | "Let's Party" | 4:07 |
| 8. | "Dream About" | 4:00 |
| 9. | "Hi-Fi Bass" | 4:12 |
| 10. | "I Like Fire" | 3:30 |
| 11. | "Mega Ton" | 3:49 |
| 12. | "Young Gotti" | 3:29 |
| 13. | "Xtremist" | 3:33 |
| 14. | "Yellow Brick Road" | 3:47 |
| 15. | "Take That Trip" | 3:30 |
| 16. | "Dubstep Drops & Laughs" | 4:07 |

=== Disc 2 ===
| No. | Title | Length |
|---|---|---|
| 1. | "Burn" | 4:05 |
| 2. | "Jump" | 3:51 |
| 3. | "Mirrorball" | 5:11 |
| 4. | "Electric Roulette" | 3:48 |
| 5. | "Sun Is Shining" | 3:32 |
| 6. | "Illusion" | 4:15 |
| 7. | "I Wanna Be a Cowboy" | 3:58 |
| 8. | "Outlawz" | 3:42 |
| 9. | "Killin' Hour" | 4:49 |
| 10. | "The Heist" | 4:08 |
| 11. | "Screams from the Grave" | 3:59 |
| 12. | "Radioactive" (Dubstep Mix, featuring A Grant & D. Reynolds) | 3:43 |

== Personnel ==
- Blackburner
- Composers: R.E. Brown, A. Grant, Kevin Jeong, D.M. Carter Jr, Ben Mc, R.D. Montgomery, D. Reynolds, N. Ramsden J. Seopardie, D. Styles
- Featured artists: Bob Marley, Lil Wayne, B.M.C., Jadakiss, Kurupt, Pusha T, Royce da 5'9", Sons of Hippies, Styles P, Yellowman

=== Production ===
- Brain Perera – Executive producer
