= Raunchy (instrumental) =

- US single

Single by Bill Justis

from the album Cloud 9
- B-side: "The Midnite Man"
- Released: September 23, 1957
- Genre: Rock and roll, instrumental rock
- Length: 2:20
- Label: Phillips International
- Songwriters: Bill Justis, Sidney Manker
- Producer: Sam Phillips

Bill Justis singles chronology
"Raunchy" / "The Midnite Man" (1957)	"Bop Train" / "String of Pearls - Cha Hot Cha" (1958)

Audio sample
- "Raunchy": file; help

"Raunchy" is an instrumental by American rock and roll artist Bill Justis, co-written with Sidney Manker and produced by Sam Phillips. The tune, from the album Cloud 9, was released as a single on the record label Phillips International Records, a sub-label of Sun Records, on September 23, 1957.

== History ==
"Raunchy" is one of the first rock songs to use the "twangy" lead guitar effect, which was later developed by others and became common for several years following its first appearance.

In 1958, a fifteen-year-old George Harrison performed it for John Lennon and Paul McCartney on the top deck of a bus in Liverpool, and was so note-perfect that Lennon decided, despite earlier reservations about Harrison's age, to let him into his band the Quarrymen, which later became the Beatles.

== Other versions ==
Justis recorded another rendition of the tune in 1962, in stereo and with considerably different guitar, for his album Bill Justis Plays 12 More Big Instrumental Hits. He recorded it once more in 1969, for his album Raunchy & Other Great Instrumentals.

Competing with Justis's release in 1957 were renditions by Billy Vaughn and Ernie Freeman. Freeman's version was his biggest solo success, reaching No. 4 on the Billboard Hot 100 in 1957, No. 1 on the R&B singles chart, and No. 11 on the Country singles chart in 1958.

Justis' version charted in the UK in 1958 at No. 11, beating an interpretation by Ken Mackintosh which charted at No. 23.

In 1957 Red Sovine and Wayne Walker wrote lyrics to the instrumental "Raunchy", and as "The New Raunchy" it was recorded by country star Webb Pierce under the pseudonym "Shady Wall".

Soon after the hit, guitarist Duane Eddy and producer Lee Hazlewood took it upon themselves to develop that style to an ultimate degree. They greatly enhanced the reverberation in their recordings, creating a far-from-light lead guitar sound. Eddy started with the big hit "Rebel Rouser" in 1958; he later made a recording of "Raunchy" for the RCA Records album Twangin' the Golden Hits in 1965.

The Jimmy Bowen Orchestra and Chorus released a version as the B-side to their 1967 single "It's Such a Pretty World Today".

"Raunchy" has been recorded by many artists, including the Ventures, Bill Black, Tom and Jerry, Al Caiola, Ace Cannon, Billy Strange, Duane Eddy, the Bill Smith Combo (also known as Tommy & the Tom Toms), Santo & Johnny, Glen Campbell, and the Incredible Bongo Band.

Years later, while working on the Beatles Anthology project in 1994, the three surviving Beatles (Paul McCartney, George Harrison, and Ringo Starr) played the tune during a jam session, it having been the song that landed George a spot in the early version of the group.

== Chart positions ==
=== Bill Justis ===
Chart (1957)	Peak position
Canada CHUM Chart (3 weeks)	1
U.S. Billboard Hot 100	2

Chart (1958)	Peak position
R&B Singles	1
Country Singles	6

=== Ernie Freeman ===
Chart (1957)	Peak position
U.S. Billboard Hot 100	4

Chart (1958)	Peak position
R&B Singles	1
Country Singles	11

Bill Justis 1962 version

Duane Eddy

== See also ==
- List of Cash Box Best Sellers number-one singles of 1957
- List of CHUM number-one singles of 1957
- List of Billboard number-one rhythm and blues hits
