= Fallen Champ: The Untold Story of Mike Tyson =

1993 television documentary film by Barbara Kopple

- Genre: Documentary
- Directed by: Barbara Kopple
- Starring: Mike Tyson
- Music by: Michael Bacon; Richard G. Mitchell
- Country of origin: United States
- Original language: English

Production
- Executive producer: Diane Sokolow
- Producer: Barbara Kopple
- Running time: 93 minutes
- Production companies: Cabin Creek Films; The Sokolow Company; TriStar Television

Original release
- Network: NBC
- Release: February 12, 1993

Fallen Champ: The Untold Story of Mike Tyson is a 1993 American made-for-television documentary film that is directed by Barbara Kopple and aired on the NBC television network on February 12, 1993. Though Tyson was in jail serving a sentence for rape, Kopple used existing interviews with the boxer, as well as her own extensive interviews with those closest to Tyson, to explore the man's history. The film traces Tyson's story from his troubled and tumultuous upbringing, through his rapid ascendancy in the ranks of the boxing world and his subsequent struggle with the trappings of fame. Fallen Champ earned Barbara Kopple a Directors Guild of America (DGA) award as Best Documentary Director of 1993.

The film was released on VHS by Columbia TriStar Home Video on March 5, 1996.

In 2011, the film was aired on ESPN Classic.
