= Jerry's =

Jerry's may refer to:

- Jerry's Famous Deli, a delicatessen chain in Southern California and Florida
- Jerry's Foods, owner of several grocery store chains, headquartered in Edina, Minnesota
- Jerry's Subs & Pizza, a fast casual sandwich and pizza restaurant chain in the Washington, D.C. area
- Jerry's Restaurants, formerly located in the Midwest and Southern U.S., now mostly converted to Denny's restaurants

== See also ==
- Jerry (disambiguation)
