= Gerig =

Gerig is a surname. Notable people with the surname include:

- Alois Gerig (born 1956), German politician
- Peter Gerig (born 1934), Swiss biathlete

== See also ==
- Gerig (music publishers)
- Gehrig (surname)
- Geri (surname)
- Gerić
