= Feel the Burn =

Studio album by Blackburner
- Released: 2012
- Genre: Dubstep; dance; electronic
- Length: 116:39
- Label: Cleopatra
- Producer: Brian Perera

Blackburner chronology
Feel the Burn (2012)	Planet Earth Attack (2012)

Feel the Burn is the debut album by Blackburner. It features the electro-dubstep based tracks "Freak You" and "Pumped Up Kicks".

== Track listing ==
1. "East Death Bunny" (Blackburner) – 4:20
2. "Dust Eater" (Blackburner) – 3:58
3. "Back In Black" (Brian Johnson/Angus Young/ Malcolm Young) – 4:06
4. "Feel the Burn" (Blackburner) – 3:33
5. "Tony Montana" (Blackburner) – 4:02
6. "Kashmir [Acid Particle Mix]" (John Bonham/Jimmy Page/Robert Planet ) – 4:06
7. "The Devil Is Real" (Skyla Talon) – 4:10
8. "Adagio Glitch" (Blackburner) – 4:56
9. "Prometheus" (Blackburner) – 4:08
10. "Freak You" (Blackburner) – 5:14
11. "Pumped Up Kicks [genXocide Mix]" (Mark Foster) – 5:00
12. "World of Dreams" (Blackburner) – 4:04
13. "Disambiguation" (Blackburner) – 4:26

== Personnel ==
=== The band ===
- Skyla Talon – guitar
- John Wesley – guitar (guest artist)
- Edgar Froese – keyboards (guest artist)
- Sister Alice – vocals (guest artist)

=== Production ===
- Skyla Talon – Mastering
- Brian Perera – Executive Producer
