= Jery =

Jery may refer to:

- Neomixis, a bird
- Yerý, a Cyrillic letter
- Jery (film), a 2006 Indian film

== See also ==
- Jerry (disambiguation)
