= Blah...Blah...Blah...Love Songs for the New Millennium =

Studio album by Scum of the Earth
- Released: October 26, 2004
- Recorded: 2004
- Genre: Industrial metal, alternative metal
- Length: 37:39
- Label: Eclipse
- Producer: Mike Riggs

Scum of the Earth chronology
Blah...Blah...Blah...Love Songs for the New Millennium (2004)	Sleaze Freak (2007)

Professional ratings
Review scores
Source	Rating
AllMusic	3.5/5 stars

Blah...Blah...Blah...Love Songs for the New Millennium is the first album by heavy metal band Scum of the Earth.

== Track listing ==
1. "I Am the Scum" – 3:16
2. "Bloodsukinfreakshow" – 2:33
3. "Get Your Dead On" – 3:56
4. "Little Spider" – 3:48
5. "Murder Song" – 3:17
6. "AltarGirl 13" – 3:41
7. "Pornstar Champion" (Remix of the Queen song "We Will Rock You") – 3:57
8. "Nothing Girl" – 3:12
9. "The Devil Made Me Do It" – 3:09
10. "Give Up Your Ghost" – 4:39
11. "Beneath the Living" – 2:11

== Personnel ==
- Tom Baker - Mastering
- Brian Belski - Mixing
- Daniel Brereton - Art direction
- Clay Campbell - Bass
- Dave Cook - Art direction
- John Dolmayan - Drums
- Frank Gryner - Mixing
- Roxanna Jacobson - Violin
- Mike Riggs - Vocals, guitar, producer
- John Tempesta - Drums, percussion, vocals
- Mike Tempesta - Guitar
