= Blackburner =

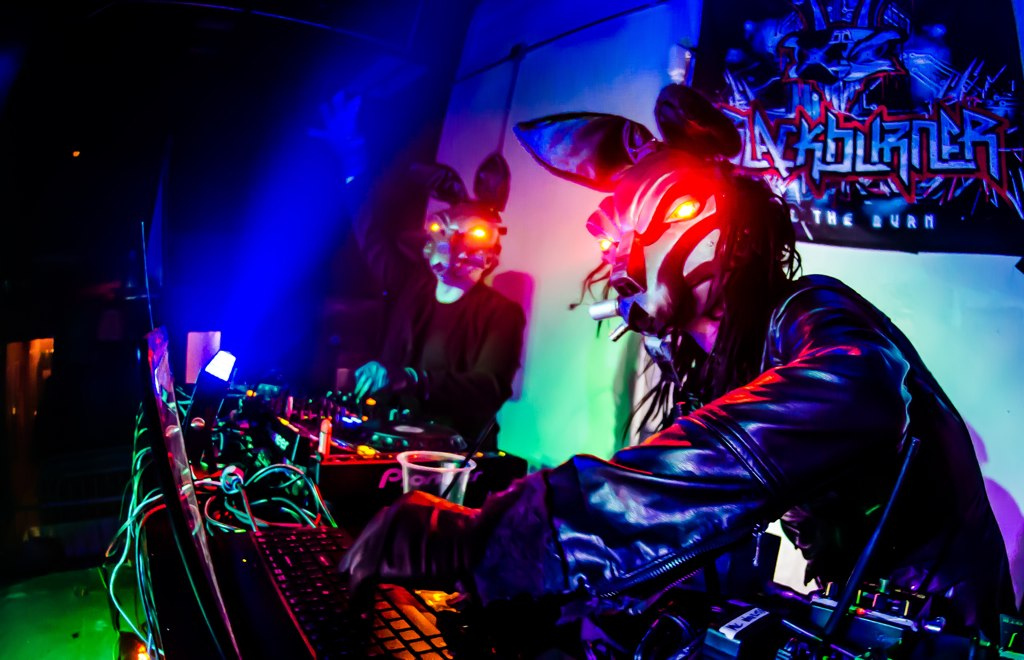
- Blackburner performing at Soho Mixed Media Bar, Honolulu, Hawaii

Background information
- Origin: Los Angeles, California, United States
- Genres: Electronica, glitch, EDM, dubstep, electro house
- Years active: 2011–present
- Labels: Cleopatra Records; Hypnotic Records
- Website: www.blackburner.org

Blackburner is an American electronic music duo. Blackburner combines elements of dubstep, metal, and electronica. A buzz started for Blackburner by remixing tracks and releasing original compositions through Cleopatra Records, initially placing Blackburner alongside dubstep artists such as Rusko, Nero and Dubba Jonny.

Blackburner's debut album, Feel the Burn, featured guest appearances by Edgar Froese of Tangerine Dream, as well as John Wesley of Porcupine Tree. The single "Freak You" was used on a national Verizon FIOS Quantum advertisement, and on NBC's hit competition program America's Got Talent.

In the summer of 2012, Blackburner was asked to support industrial group Ministry on their AEG (Anschutz Entertainment Group) American tour. They also appeared at SXSW 2012. During this time, Blackburner met William Shatner briefly, inspiring Skyla to write a sci-fi driven album, Planet Earth Attack.

2017 Release new album Dog Eats Rabbit (with rapper DMX)

== Studio albums ==
Year	Album
2012	Feel the Burn
2012	Planet Earth Attack
2013	Drop Bass Not Bombs
2014	From Dusk to Dub
2017	Dog Eats Rabbit (with DMX)

== Compilation albums ==
Year	Album
2012	Dubstep Electro Glitch
2012	Seventy Dubstep – Electronic Essentials
2012	Club 2012 House Dubstep Trance Hits
2012	Bass Culture
2012	Blackburner Presents: Dubstep Breakout 2012
2012	100 Dubstep Club Essentials
2012	99 Dubstep Essentials
2012	100 Dubstep – Club Tracks
2012	Dubstep – Anthems 2012
2012	Dubstep Mania 2012
2012	100 Dubstep Now

== Singles ==
Year	Title	Label
2012	"The World Is Ours"	Hypnotic Records
2012	"Wonderland Room"	Hypnotic Records
2012	"Back In Black"	Cleopatra Records
2012	"Dust Eater"	Cleopatra Records
2012	"In Love With the City" featuring Geri X	Cleopatra Records

== Remixes ==
Year	Track	Artist
2011	White Lines	Grandmaster Flash
2012	In-A-Gadda-Da-Vida	Iron Butterfly
2012	Hey Baby...So Sad	New Skin
2012	Take Me Away	Burman feat. Jessica Jean
2012	No Diggty	Blackstreet
2012	The Devil Is Real	Modelsaint
2012	Internet Friends	Knife Party

== Appears on ==
"Freak You" was featured in America's Got Talent the Las Vegas Round 2012 Episode 13. "Freak You" was featured in Verizon FIOS national ad campaign for Verizon Fios Quantum.

== Chart history ==
Drop Bombs Not Bass (Beatport) placed Number 1 on in the Dubstep Charts (December 6, 2012).

Band Equity placed them as the number 1 Dubstep artist on ReverbNation.com
