= Dog Eats Rabbit =

Dog Eats Rabbit (Blackburner vs. DMX)

Studio album by Blackburner, DMX
- Released: April 7, 2017
- Genre: Dubstep; electronic; hip hop
- Length: 1:18:12
- Label: Cleopatra; Hypnotic

Blackburner, DMX chronology
| From Dusk to Dub (2014) | Dog Eats Rabbit (Blackburner vs. DMX) (2017) |

Dog Eats Rabbit is the follow-up album by Blackburner to From Dusk to Dub. This album is a collaboration with DMX.

== Track listing ==
| No. | Title | Length |
|---|---|---|
| 1. | "We Gonna Tear Shit Up" | 3:48 |
| 2. | "Shut Em Down" | 3:41 |
| 3. | "Game" | 4:05 |
| 4. | "How We Roll" | 3:41 |
| 5. | "Dog Fight" | 3:34 |
| 6. | "Let It Go" | 3:20 |
| 7. | "Sin" | 3:47 |
| 8. | "Dog Madness" | 3:45 |
| 9. | "Get Back On My Feet" | 3:48 |
| 10. | "Dog Eats Rabbit" | 4:25 |
| 11. | "The Fight" | 3:24 |
| 12. | "Motherfuckas Want" | 4:00 |
| 13. | "Chains in Your Brain" | 3:42 |
| 14. | "Fuck With" (RR Anthem) | 3:23 |
| 15. | "Assassins" | 3:47 |
| 16. | "Hurting" | 3:40 |
| 17. | "Something Going' Tonight" | 3:32 |
| 18. | "WTF Bitch" | 3:41 |
| 19. | "Don't Get It Twisted" | 3:31 |
| 20. | "Preach" | 3:41 |
| 21. | "Meet Me Outside" | 3:57 |

== Personnel ==
- Blackburner
- DMX
- Brain Perera – Executive Producer
