= In Xanadu =

Book by William Dalrymple

In Xanadu: A Quest
- Author: William Dalrymple
- Language: English
- Genre: Travel writing
- Publisher: Penguin Books
- Publication date: 1989
- Publication place: United Kingdom
- Media type: Print
- Pages: 320
- ISBN: 0-00-654415-0
- OCLC: 43785829

In Xanadu: A Quest is a 1989 travel book by William Dalrymple.

== Overview ==
In Xanadu traces the path taken by Marco Polo from the Church of the Holy Sepulchre in Jerusalem to the site of Shangdu, famed as Xanadu in English literature, in Inner Mongolia, China.

The book begins with William Dalrymple taking a vial of oil from the burning lamps of the Holy Sepulchre, which he is to transport to Shangdu, the summer seat of the King Kubla Khan. It has been mentioned that Kubla Khan wanted a hundred learned men armed with Christian knowledge to come to his Khanate and spread the knowledge of Christianity. However, that plan was abandoned, and Marco Polo, along with his uncle, set out from Jerusalem on the Silk Route to Shang-du, to deliver a vial of the holy oil, which was rumoured to be inexhaustible, and therefore kept the lamps at the Sepulchre constantly burning. The rest of the journey, undertaken with Laura Wade-Gery to Lahore and then with ex-girlfriend Louisa to Xanadu, is outlined with descriptions of most of the ancient sites along the Silk Route, through which Marco Polo was supposed to have passed.

The author compares the old time splendour of the cities on the Silk Route to their present physical and political conditions, and thereby illustrates the changes. Of special note is the part on his passage through the then revolution-torn Iran. He also describes the bureaucratic tangle he got into while getting a permit for China via the Northern Areas in Pakistan, and spending a couple of days in the Kohistan valley near Besham, on the banks of the river Indus in Pakistan, which is supposedly the last area where Alexander the Great might have stopped during his conquests.

People of different ethnicities are also mentioned in the book, mainly the present-day Central Asians and the Gujars from Kohistan and Swat valleys, although various scholars in Pakistan have doubted the veracity of many of these accounts. The author also describes a primitive rite of the Gujars which he claims he accidentally stumbled upon while exploring the area. Dalrymple speculates that the rite is a 'shin' ritual, apparently a throwback to the ancient pagan religion of the Gujars, which they followed before converting to Islam; whereas Pakistani scholars opine that the incident simply depicts a wedding feast in Kohistan, in Northern Pakistan, where a goat is ritually slaughtered for the guests and is typical of a festive banquet of the area, and that Dalrymple is making much out of his rather hurried and uninformed passage through these parts. These scholars throw a skeptical light on the portions of this book connected to Dalrymple's travels from Mansehra town until his passage into China.

== Reception ==
The book, written when Dalrymple was 22, received positive reviews and won several awards, establishing the author as a new face on the British literary scene. Travel writer Patrick Leigh Fermor chose In Xanadu as his book of the year in The Spectator and wrote: "William Dalrymple's In Xanadu carries us breakneck from a predawn glimmer in the Holy Sepulchre right across Asia... It is learned and comic, and a most gifted first book touched by the spirits of Kinglake, Robert Byron and E. Waugh." Alec Guinness agreed, describing the book in The Sunday Times as "the delightful, and funny, surprise mystery tour of the year."
