= Skyla Talon =

American singer-songwriter

Background information
- Origin: Hollywood, California, United States
- Genres: Hard rock, glam metal, dubstep, EDM
- Label: Cleopatra

Skyla Talon is an American hard rock guitarist, singer-songwriter and record producer. Skyla is the vocalist/guitar player in Modelsaint. He is also known for his role as the guitarist in Scum of the Earth which is fronted by Riggs. Talon is also the founding member of Killingbird and Blackburner.

== Biography ==
=== Early life ===
Skyla grew up in Mount Pleasant, Michigan and started playing guitar at an early age. Skyla soon moved to Los Angeles where he formed the gutter rock band Killingbird. In 2002 they were signed to 2KSounds and distributed by EMI Music. Killingbird released two albums in the next couple years including their self-titled release and Waste Another Yesterday. In 2004 Skyla's first solo CD was released titled All The Dead Flowers. In 2005 Skyla joined Scum of the Earth which is fronted by former Rob Zombie guitarist, Riggs. In 2007 he helped record their second album Sleaze Freak. With addition to guitar, Skyla's vocals are featured on the fan fave songI Am Monster. He continued to tour with Scum of the Earth up through 2008. In 2009 Skyla Talon released multiple albums under Cleopatra Records including his side-project The Rotten Bastards and also a new solo album Last of Summertime.

=== Current ===
Skyla Talon is currently the vocalist/guitarist in the band Modelsaint which also features former Prong drummer Dan Laudo.

== Discography ==
=== Albums ===
- Killingbird – self-titled (2002)
- Killingbird – Waste Another Yesterday (2003)
- Skyla Talon – All The Dead Flowers (2004)
- Killingbird – Scar (2009)
- The Rotten Bastards – Year of the Bastard (2009)
- Skyla Talon – Last Of Summertime (2009)
- Skyla Talon – Off The Radio (2009)

=== Compilations ===
- Heat Slick records – Heat Slick Records Compilation (2002)
- The Album Network – Retail Tune-Up #86 (2002)
- Metal Sludge – Hey That's What I Call Sludge (2003)
- Jetboys Of Babylon – A Tribute To The New York Dolls (2005)
- Riot On Sunset – Vol. 2 (2007)
- Bumps and Rails – w/ L.A. Guns, 69 Eyes, Gemini Five (2008)

=== Featured ===
- The Mistakes – Dressed For Suckcess (1999)
- Scum of the Earth – Sleaze Freak (2007)
