= Sleaze Freak =

Studio album by Scum of the Earth
- Released: October 23, 2007
- Recorded: 2007
- Genre: Industrial metal, alternative metal
- Label: Eclipse
- Producer: Jeff Smith

Scum of the Earth chronology
Blah...Blah...Blah...Love Songs for the New Millennium (2004)	Sleaze Freak (2007)

Sleaze Freak is the second studio album by industrial metal band Scum of the Earth. It was released October 23, 2007.

The album sold about 800 copies its first week, failing to chart on the Billboard 200.

== Track listing ==
=== Disc 1 ===
1. Bombshell from Hell – 3:16
2. Hate X 13 – 3:31
3. Sleaze Freak – 3:02
4. Devilscum – 3:02
5. Death Stomp – 1:19
6. I Am Monster – 3:38
7. Love Pig – 3:14
8. Macabro Expectaculo – 3:38
9. Corpse Grinders – 2:12
10. The Devil Made Me Do It 2 – 2:35
11. Scum-O-Rama – 1:08
12. 13 Freaks – 3:15

Tracks 13–22 are silence.

23. Just Like Me – 5:01

=== Disc 2 ===
1. Bonus DVD Content [TBC]

== Personnel ==
- Mike Riggs – vocals, guitar
- Clay Campbell – bass
- Skyla Talon – guitar
- Ivan de Prume – drums
