= Sons of Hippies =

American indie/neo-psych rock band

- Origin: Sarasota, Florida, United States
- Genres: Alternative, post space rock, post shoegaze, indie psych
- Years active: 2008–present
- Label: Cleopatra Records
- Members: Katherine Kelly; Jonas Canales

Sons of Hippies is an American indie/neo-psych rock band from Sarasota, Florida, founded by Katherine Kelly and Jonas Canales.

== History ==
High in the mountains of Tennessee, Sons of Hippies was conceived at a festival on a 700-acre farm on a sunny June afternoon, after Kelly, agreed to marry Canales simply to secure his US citizenship. Their album, Warriors of the Light, received the critic’s choice award from Tampa’s popular Creative Loafing publication for “Best Modern-Sounding Record” of 2009.

While on tour throughout the East Coast, Sons of Hippies wrote their sophomore album, A-Morph (also produced by Klimchuck,) which was released in September 2010 and was accompanied by a journal Kelly kept detailing the recording sessions. During this year the group also recorded but never released an EP, Invisible Personalities, titled after a rogue AM radio transmission that was captured in their studio on Kelly's loop station.

In the summer of 2011, the band released a 5-song space rock concept album called Fade to White, which was distributed with a typewritten lyric book.

Bassist Morgan Soltes joined the Hippies in the balmiest December 2013 had ever seen.

Michael Murphy was asked to play Keys, Synth, Kaos Pad, and Electronic percussion in June 2014. In December 2012 the band signed with Cleopatra Records and released a full length album, Griffons at the Gates of Heaven, in 2013.

== Griffons at the Gates of Heaven ==
The album was mixed by Jack Endino ( Nirvana, L7, Mudhoney ) and mastered at Abbey Road Studios by Andy Walter (Radiohead, David Bowie, U2). "besides including the main trio, also includes a few guest artists. One is prog rock's multi-instrumentalist Billy Sherwood. Billy Sherwood is behind the keyboard playing sounds you'd ever want to hear. Andy Walter at Abbey Road Studios in London, England, mastered Sons of Hippies: The Griffons at the Gates of Heaven. The same walls hearing the sounds of old psychedelia of the day. Fits the whole package here very well".

== Discography ==
=== Studio albums ===
| Year | Album |
|---|---|
| 2009 | Warriors of the Light |
| 2013 | Griffons at the Gates of Heaven |

=== EPs ===
| Year | EP |
|---|---|
| 2010 | Invisible Personalities |
| 2012 | Fade to White |
| 2013 | Mirror Ball - Blackburner Remix |
| 2013 | Blood in the Water - The Raveonettes Remix |

=== Other appearances ===
"Time of the Season" (Zombies cover) on Psych-Out Christmas (Cleopatra Records, 2013)
"The Soft Parade" (Doors cover) on A Psych Tribute To The Doors (Cleopatra Records, 2014)
"Gimme Shelter" (Rolling Stones cover) on Stoned - A Psych Tribute To The Rolling Stones (Cleopatra Records, 2015)
