= Geri (given name) =

Geri is a feminine given name and a shorter form (hypocorism) of the given name Geraldine. It is also an alternative spelling of the masculine given name Jerry.

== People ==
Notable people with the name include:

- Geri Allen (1957–2017), American jazz pianist and music producer
- Geri Çipi (born 1976), Albanian football defender
- Geri Donnelly (born 1965), Canadian association football midfielder
- Geri Doran (born 1966), American academic
- Geri Evans (1940–2018), American politician and teacher
- Geri Hall (born 1972), Canadian actress and comedian
- Geri Halliwell (born 1972), English singer and songwriter, member of the Spice Girls
- Geri Hoo (1939–2007), American actress
- Geri Huser (born 1963), American politician
- Geri Jewell (born 1956), American actress
- Geri M. Joseph (1923–2023), American journalist, academic and political figure
- Geri Larkin, American Buddhist
- Geri Malaj (born 1989), Albanian footballer
- Geri Mandagi (born 1988), Indonesian football goalkeeper
- Geri Maye, Irish presenter on radio and television
- Geri McGee (1936–1982), American model and socialite
- Geri Palast, Managing Director of the Israel Action Network
- Geri-Lynn Ramsay (born 1988), Canadian curler
- Geri Reischl (born 1959), American actress and singer
- Geri Theis, American politician
- Geri Lynch Tomich (born 1964), American synchronized figure skating coach
- Geri Ward, American artist
- Geri Winkler (born 1956), Austrian mountaineer
- Geri X (born 1989), Bulgarian-born singer-songwriter

== Fictional characters ==
- Geri, an old man character from the 1997 Disney/Pixar animated short film Geri's Game and the 1999 Disney/Pixar animated film Toy Story 2 as the Cleaner
- Geri Evans (Family Affairs) from the British soap opera Family Affairs
- Geri Hudson from the British Channel 4 soap opera, Hollyoaks
