= Modelsaint =

ModelSaint

Background information
- Origin: Los Angeles, California, United States
- Genres: Hard rock, glam metal, Heavy metal
- Years active: 2010–present
- Labels: Famous and Faithless
- Members: Skyla Talon; Kyle Hickey; Kevin Lewis; Dan Laudo
- Website: Official Site

ModelSaint is an American hard rock band from Los Angeles, California, United States.

The band was formed in 2010 by Skyla Talon (guitars and lead vocals). From 2005- 2008 Skyla was on full-time guitar duty as a member of Scum of the Earth, a band fronted by former Rob Zombie guitarist Riggs. Skyla is also well known for the long established gutter rock band Killingbird, who released their last album Scar in 2009.

Dan Laudo from the metal band Prong is the backbone in ModelSaint. Dan got his drumming start by teaming up with Nine Inch Nails founder Trent Reznor. Dan met up with Skyla Talon in 2007 while on tour with Scum of the Earth. The teaming up kickstarted the song writing process and led to the formation of ModelSaint in 2010. In early 2011, the band added Kevin Lewis, known as a tattoo artist and member of Factory 81 and LiftPoint at the time. Rounding out the line-up is the Chicago-based guitarist, Kyle Hickey.

ModelSaint's video for "Starin' Down A Loaded Barrel" was released in November 2010. The band's debut album was released in 2012.
