= Phillips International Records =

Record label

Phillips International Records is a sub-label of Sun Records started by Sam Phillips in October 1957.

The design had the whole label as a blue and white Earth-globe with "Phillips" prominent between the words "Sam C." and "International Corp" on a red, white, and blue ribbon to the left and below.

Based in Memphis, the label was home to the million-selling "Raunchy" by Bill Justis, who later became a major player in arranging and conducting. Carl Mann had hits with "Mona Lisa" and "Pretend" in 1959, and Charlie Rich recorded "Lonely Weekends" for the label in 1960. Phillips International Records was dissolved in 1963 after Philips Records complained about the similar name.

== See also ==
- List of record labels
