= Vivian Wade-Gery =

British classical archaeologist

Vivian Wade-Gery (née Whitfield) (1897-1988) was a British classical archaeologist.

== Career ==
Whitfield studied Classics at Trinity College Dublin and Somerville College, Oxford, where she obtained a BA degree in 1924. She was subsequently appointed lecturer in Classics at the University of Reading, and in 1924 to 1925 she received a Gilchrist studentship to study at the British School at Athens to study Greek topgraphy. She spent the period 1927 to 1928 again at the British school at Athens, on leave from Reading and supported by the Bryce studentship, Lady Margaret Hall and the Ireland Trustees, this time studying Spartan art.

After her marriage in 1928, she collaborated with her husband in his epigraphical work (such as for providing photographs of inscriptions for his 1932/33 publication), as well as with other prominent scholars of the period. She is credited in the preface of Victor Ehrenberg’s The People of Aristophanes (1943) for performing "the task of complete revision with untiring devotion and scholarly acumen".

Her correspondence is held as part of the Ure Museum archives at the University of Reading and the Centre for the Study of Ancient Documents at the University of Oxford. Whitfield was among the archaeologists caricatured by Piet de Jong in Greece in the 1920s and 1930s.

== Personal life ==
She married the epigrapher and ancient historian Henry Theodore Wade-Gery in 1928. They had one son, Robert Wade-Gery (later Sir Robert), born in 1929.
