= Tison =

Tison may refer to:

People

- André Tison (1885 – 1963), French Olympic track and field athlete
- Annette Tison (b. 1942), French architect and writer
- James C. Tison, Jr. (1908 – 1991), American admiral and civil engineer, sixth Director of the United States Coast and Geodetic Survey and first Director of the Environmental Science Services Administration Corps
- Sophie Tison (born 1958), French computer scientist
- Tison Street (b. 1943), American composer and violinist

Other

- Tison v. Arizona, a 1987 United States Supreme Court case

See also

- Tyson
