= Tom and Jerry (disambiguation) =

Tom and Jerry is an American animated media franchise and series of comedy short films.

Tom and Jerry may also refer to:

== In the Tom and Jerry franchise ==
- Tom and Jerry filmography, a list of the 166 cartoon shorts
- List of Tom and Jerry feature films, a list of feature-length films
  - Tom and Jerry: The Movie (1992)
  - Tom & Jerry (2021 American film)
- List of Tom and Jerry video games
- Tom and Jerry#Television, a list of TV shows

== Other uses in arts and entertainment ==
- Tom and Jerry (Van Beuren), fictional characters in a series of cartoons 1931–1933
- Tom and Jerry, or Life in London, staged in 1821, based on characters by Pierce Egan
- "Tom and Jerry", a short story featured in All in the Day's Riding, a 1933 collection by Will James
- Tom Good and Jerry Leadbetter, in the British sitcom The Good Life
- Tom and Jerry Yeo, brothers in the Singaporean film I Not Stupid Too
- Tom & Jerry (album), by Simon & Garfunkel, 2002
- Tom & Jerry (1995 film), an Indian Malayalam-language comedy
- Tom and Jerry (2021 Indian film)
- "Tom and Jerry" (song), a 2026 song by John Mayer

== Performing pairs ==
- Tom and Jerry (fl. 1956 to 1959), (Tom Graph and Jerry Landis) later known as Simon & Garfunkel
- Tom and Jerry (guitarists) (fl. early 1960s), Tommy Tomlinson and Jerry Kennedy
- Tom Cheek and Jerry Howarth, radio announcers for Toronto Blue Jays baseball team 1981–2005
- Tom & Jerry, alias used by the electronic music duo 4hero.

== Other uses ==
- Tom and Jerry (American football), the winning play of Super Bowl LVIII
- Tom and Jerry (drink), a cocktail containing eggnog and rum
- Tom & Jerry (roller coaster), at Parque Warner Madrid, Spain
- Tom and Jerry engine, a pump at Great Orme, Wales
- Tom and Jerry, nicknames for the satellites of the GRACE and GRACE-FO mission
- Tom and Jerry, processors in the Atari Jaguar game console
- Tom and Jerry, a nickname for an 1800s British beerhouse

== See also ==
- "Tom & Gerri", TV episode of Inside No. 9
- Jerry and Tom, a 1998 American film
- Life in London, a 1821 British novel where the Tom and Jerry names originated
