= Tyson Lee =

Tyson Lee may refer to:

- List of Home and Away characters (2014)#Tyson Lee, a fictional character from Australian television series Home and Away
- Tyson Lee (American football) (born 1987), former starting quarterback for the Mississippi State Bulldogs
