= Scum of the Earth (band) =

American industrial metal band

Scum of the Ǝarth
- Origin: Arkansas, U.S.
- Genres: Industrial metal; alternative metal
- Years active: 2003–present
- Labels: Eclipse, Goomba
- Members: RiG̈G̈S; Eddie Travis; Nick Mason
- Past members: Clay Campbell; Mike Tempesta; John Tempesta; Skyla Talon; Ivan de Prume; John Dolmayan; Dan Laudo; Brandon Workman; Jesse Saint

Scum of the Ǝarth is an American industrial metal side project created by Mike Riggs. A full recording band was formed in 2003 with other musicians associated with Rob Zombie, who temporarily set aside his music career to focus on writing and directing movies. They have released three albums and eight singles.

SOTƎ had an initial lineup of Riggs (lead vocalist, guitarist, songwriter and owner), brothers Mike (guitarist) and John Tempesta (drummer), and Clay Campbell (bassist).

The band's name comes from a 1978 episode of the television series WKRP in Cincinnati. The Hoodlum Rock episode is about a concert being promoted at the station, of a "hoodlum rock" band called Scum of the Earth. The name also borrows from the Rob Zombie single "Scum of the Earth" that was originally featured in the soundtrack to the 2000 action film Mission: Impossible II and Zombie's 2001 album The Sinister Urge.

== Members ==
Current

- Mike Riggs – vocals, guitar (2003–present)
- Eddie Travis – drums, percussion (2011–present)
- Nick Mason – bass (2011–present)

Former

- Mike Tempesta – guitar (2003–2005)
- John Tempesta – drums, percussion (2003–2004, 2004–2006)
- Clay Campbell – bass (2003–2007)
- John Dolmayan – drums (2004)
- Skyla Talon – guitar (2005–2008)
- Ivan de Prume – drums (2006–2007)
- Brandon Workman – bass (2007–2010)
- Dan Laudo – drums (2007–2010)
- Jesse Saint – guitar (2008–2013)

== Discography ==
Albums

- 2004: Blah...Blah...Blah...Love Songs for the New Millennium
- 2007: Sleaze Freak
- 2012: The Devil Made Me Do It

Singles

- 2013: "Zombie Apocalypse" (featuring Volkstroker)
- 2013: "The Devil Made Me Do It 3" (featuring Volkstroker)
- 2013: "Born Again Masochist" (featuring Exageist)
- 2017: "Dance Motherf***er"
- 2020: "Bigfoot and the Armies of Puma Punka"
- 2022: "Ziggurats of Mesopotamia"
