= Saint-Géry =

Saint-Géry (which refers to Saint Gaugericus) may refer to:

- Saint-Géry, Dordogne, France
- Saint-Géry, Chastre, Belgium
- Saint-Géry, Lot, France
- Île Saint-Géry, a former island in Brussels, Belgium.
