= Geri Ward =

American painter

- Born: Washington, D.C., United States
- Education: Ohio State University
- Style: Watercolor

Geri Ward is an American artist.

== Life and career ==
Geri Ward was born and raised in Washington, D.C. She earned a Master's Degree in Experimental Psychology from Ohio State University, and worked for many years as a research psychologist. After starting a family and moving to Montana, she took up watercolor painting, which she has continued for over 37 years. Ward approaches painting in an experimental way without trying to predict or control the outcome. She remains open to whenever the media and her imagination take her. Ward has been the gallery attendant for the Jesse Wilver Gallery, now part of the Emerson Center, for the last ten years in Bozeman, Montana where she exhibits her work.

She creates her artwork by the collectibles that she has placed around her house. She searches for an image by "pulling it out of chaos" and when it appears, she gives it a title. When she moved to Bozeman, she could not find a job in experimental psychology and started doing watercolor painting. Her work has been shown in two salon D'Automme shows in Paris, at the Institute Mexicano Norteamericano de Relacionnes Culturales in Mexico City and with "Women's Work", the Montana Women's Center Art Survey Exhibition. In addition, she exhibited in New York at the 33rd exhibition of the Knickerbocker Artists at the Salmagundi Club from November 22 to December 3, 1983, and at the 83rd Annual Open Watercolors Exhibition February 10 to 18 1983 at the National Arts Club. Also, Ward has received over a dozen awards from Montana Art societies and shows.
