= Jerry's Restaurants =

Restaurant chain

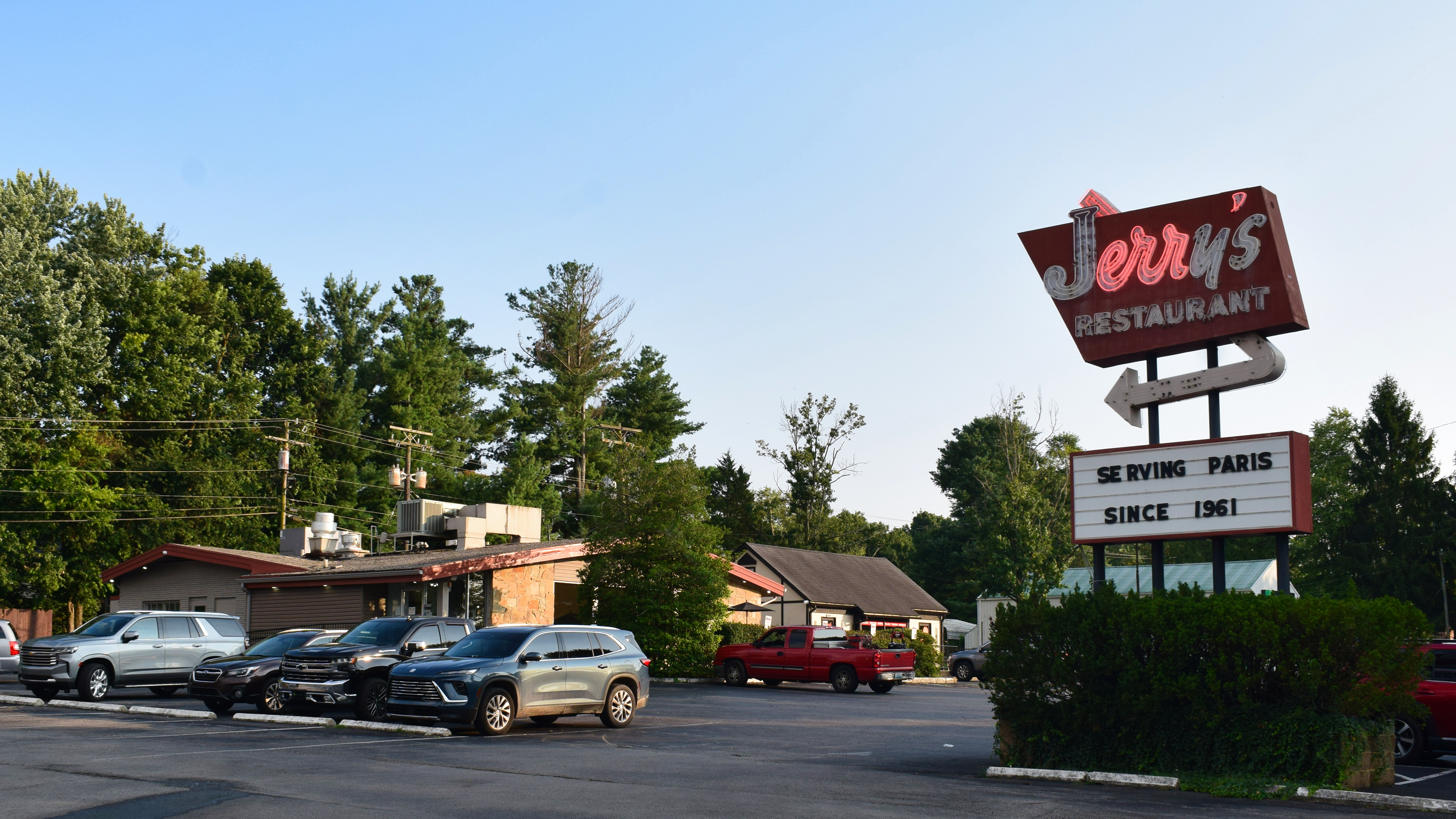
- Industry: Restaurants
- Predecessor: White Tavern
- Founded: White Tavern: 1929 in Shelbyville, Kentucky; Jerry's: 1946 in Lexington, Kentucky
- Founder: Jerry Lederer
- Number of locations: 1 (2021)
- Area served: United States
- Key people: Barry Sargent General Manager of Paris, Kentucky Location
- Owner: Jerrico, Inc. (until 1990); Great American Restaurants (after 1990)

Jerry's Restaurants is a single restaurant in Kentucky that is the lone remnant of a large American restaurant chain that was founded by Jerry Lederer, who initially opened the White Tavern restaurant in Kentucky in 1929. Lederer subsequently opened Jerry's in 1946, and franchising began in 1957. Very similar to Big Boy restaurants, Jerry's was located in the Midwest and South. Following a sale of the company in 1990, some Jerry's restaurants were converted to Denny's by the new owners. By 2012, about a dozen locations had remained in Kentucky and southern Indiana, some of which were called Jerry's J-Boy Restaurants. By 2021, only one location remained open, in Paris, Kentucky.

An unrelated separate chain of Jerry's restaurants, named after co-founder Jerry Goucher, operates in the western United States. As of 2021, it has four locations in Arizona, Nevada, and Oklahoma.

== History ==
Jerry Lederer, a resident of Louisville, Kentucky, had been inspired by the success of White Castle hamburger stands and decided to open his own hamburger stand named White Tavern Shop. The five-stool restaurant opened in 1929, in Shelbyville, Kentucky. White Tavern expanded during the 1930s, and by 1943, it had 13 locations in three states.

Only two White Tavern locations remained following the effects of World War II rationing. In 1946, Lederer opened a 14-stool roast beef sandwich stand named Jerry's, in Lexington, Kentucky. At approximately the same time, Warren W. Rosenthal, a student at the University of Kentucky, rented an apartment in Lederer's home; they subsequently became friends, and Rosenthal joined the Jerry's Restaurants company in 1948. Rosenthal became the company's chief executive officer in 1957, and franchising began that year. Into the 1960s, the company expanded with a chain of drive-in restaurants. Rosenthal became the company president in 1963, following Lederer's death from a heart attack that year.

As of 1965, the company had 53 locations in six states. As of the company's 40th anniversary in 1969, it had 67 locations, many of them in the Lexington and Louisville areas. The company was operated by the Lexington-based Jerrico, Inc., with Rosenthal as Jerrico's president. Jerrico operated 16 company owned restaurants, while the rest were franchised. Some White Tavern locations remained in New Jersey, but under different ownership. In 1969, Jerrico launched a new restaurant chain, Long John Silver's. It became a success and was Jerrico's primary business focus moving forward.

Jerry's was particularly successful in Kentucky during the 1960s and 1970s. On May 1, 1990, Jerrico announced it would sell its 46 Jerry's locations to the Atlanta-based Great American Restaurants, the largest franchisee of Denny's. Great American Restaurants planned to gradually convert most of the Jerry's locations into Denny's. The Jerry's restaurants were mostly located in Kentucky and Indiana. Jerrico sold the chain in order to focus on its Long John Silver's brand.

Following the sale, Great American Restaurants stated that it did not intend to convert the entire Jerry's chain into Denny's. By 1993, several Jerry's restaurants in Kentucky had been converted to Denny's. Others continued operating under the Jerry's name.

Some Jerry's restaurants became known as Jerry's J-Boy. By 2015, the number of locations had decreased; however, there were still at least three locations, all located in Kentucky. Two locations closed in early 2020, leaving only one location in Paris, Kentucky.

== Western U.S. chain ==
A separate chain of Jerry's Restaurants has operated in the western United States since the 1960s. It was founded by Thomas and Jerry Goucher, the latter of whom died in 2005, at the age of 78. The Jerry's Restaurants company was later renamed as Sunwest Restaurant Concepts, Inc. As of 2021, there were four restaurants remaining, located in Arizona, Nevada, and Oklahoma.
