= Geri route =

The Geri route is a set of streets in northern Chandigarh where youth, mostly students, regularly drive cars and motorbikes. The word geri means "rounds", and thus the name derives from the "rounds" that people make through the route. The route, spans from Sectors 8,9,10 to 11, with the core being around DAV College, Home Science College for Girls in Sector-10 and Govt. College for Girls in Sector-11. It has been used in this manner since the 1970s, with the route especially gaining popularity in the 1980s when car ownership became more common among young residents.

Google Maps has now changed this street's name from Geri Route to Azaadi Route in response to an appeal made by Deeptha Vivekanand as part of Bekhauf Azaadi (fearless freedom) March that came as an outburst after DJ Varnika Kundu was stalked on an August night 2017.

== Valentine's Day ==
Since at least 2001, local police have maintained a strong presence on Valentine's Day to prevent sexual harassment and other forms of harassment, as well as traffic violations. In 2007 and 2011, Panjab University, which lies along the route, closed its campus, allowing only those with student permits to enter. In addition, at least as far back as 2002, portions of the route have been barricaded to completely block traffic. The heavy police presence is in part due to documented illegal activities, such as the molestation of women on the route. Police also set up checkpoints and provide other security on Holi.
