= Bill Tyson =

Irish writer, producer and journalist

Bill Tyson is an Irish writer, producer and documentary maker. As of 2020, he was working with Dublin Community Television and the Irish Mail on Sunday. He previously worked for the Sunday Tribune and the Irish Independent.

== Journalism ==
In 2000 and 2002, while working for the Irish Independent, Tyson won two ESB National Media Awards in the "Business & Finance" category. The 2002 award was for his "hard-hitting pieces relating to personal finances" and "his exposure of over-pricing by financial institutions". He won a further ESB National Media Award in 2004.

In 2007, while working as a business correspondent for the Sunday Tribune, Tyson was shortlisted in the "Specialist Business Reporting" category of the inaugural UCD Smurfit School Business Journalist Awards. In 2008, Tyson resigned from the Tribune "in solidarity with" the then business editor of the Sunday Tribune, who was reputedly sacked following a complaint from an advertiser about an unsigned article.

As of 2013, Tyson was a contributor to the RTÉ TV series "The Consumer Show". Since 2013, he has also been a columnist with the Irish Daily Mail and Irish Mail on Sunday titles.

== Producer ==
Tyson produced a short film, "Whatever Turns You On", which won several awards, including Best Short Short at the 2009 Aspen Shortsfest. It was also short-listed for the Best Short Film award at the Boston Irish Film Festival. Also in 2009, the short film Veronique was released. It was written and produced by Tyson under the Irish Film Board's Virtual Cinema scheme.

By late 2020, Tyson had a production role on "Romancing Ireland", a six part series on sustainable food production for DCTV. Tyson, who has an MA in screenwriting, also co-wrote and produced a four-hour television series for DCTV, The House. He also produced another documentary for DCTV, titled A Century of Sailing, about the oldest sailing boats in the world still racing.

In 2020, Tyson produced "Nicolas Cruz Hernandez: Still Fighting", an RTÉ Radio 1 documentary about a Cuban who coached Ireland to Olympic boxing success.

== Books ==
Tyson wrote and published a finance book, "Your Money", which was a top ten non-fiction best-seller several times between 1996 and 2004.

A biography of Mayoman Admiral William Brown, written by the Argentine author Marcos Aguinis and translated by Bill Tyson, was published in 2006.
