= Geri (surname) =

Geri is a surname. Notable people with the surname include:

- Iska Geri (1920–2002), German film and television actress
- Joe Geri (1924–2002), American football player
- Janette Geri (1961–2018), Australian singer-songwriter
- Ya'akov Geri (1901–1974), Israeli lawyer

== See also ==
- Geri (given name)
