= Jerry (company) =

Insurance broker

- Logo
- Founders: Art Agrawal; Musawir Shah; Lina Zhang
- Headquarters: Palo Alto, California, United States
- Key people: Art Agrawal (CEO); Musawir Shah (CTO)
- Number of employees: 186 (2021)
- Website: jerry.ai

Jerry Services Inc. (doing business as Jerry) is an American company based in Palo Alto, California. Jerry's mobile app offers vehicle and home insurance comparisons, among other services.

== Business model ==
Jerry's mobile app allows users to compare and buy insurance, primarily for vehicle but also home insurance. The software uses artificial intelligence and machine learning, and Jerry generates revenue by earning a percentage of premiums when users purchase insurance policies. The company is a licensed insurance broker for approximately 4 million customers, as of 2023.

== History ==
Jerry was co-founded by Art Agrawal, Musawir Shah, and Lina Zhang in 2017. The company's mobile app launched in January 2019. Agrawal, who previously co-founded YourMechanic, is Jerry's chief executive officer (CEO). Shah and Zhang became chief technology officer and vice president of operations, respectively. Based in Palo Alto, California, Jerry expanded into Lockport, New York in 2019. The company has 186 employees, as of 2021. Jerry also has an office in Toronto.

Jerry has raised $242 million in venture capital since 2017. Goodwater Capital led the $28 million Series B round in May 2021; Jay Vijayan was among the angel investors. In August, Jerry raised $75 million in a Series C round which valued the company at $450 million. Goodwater led the round, which also saw participation by Highland Capital Partners. Jerry secured $110 million in series C2 equity and debt financing in 2023.
