= Deraz Geri =

Deraz Geri درزگري
- Village
- Location within Iran
- Coordinates: 38°14′00″N 48°50′00″E
- Country: Iran
- Province: Gilan
- County: Talesh
- Bakhsh: Haviq
- Rural District: Chubar

Population (2006)
  - Total: 292
- Time zone: UTC+3:30 (IRST)
  - Summer (DST): UTC+4:30 (IRDT)

Deraz Geri (Persian: درزگري, also Romanized as Deraz Gerī; also known as Daraz Keri, Darzeh Kerī, and Derāz Kerī) is a village in Chubar Rural District, Haviq District, Talesh County, Gilan Province, Iran. At the 2006 census, its population was 292, in 66 families.
