= Janette Geri =

Australian singer-songwriter

- Born: 1961; Darlinghurst, Australia
- Died: 29 June 2018 (aged 56–57)
- Occupation: Musician
- Years active: 1986-2018

Janette Geri (1961 – 29 June 2018) was an Australian singer-songwriter.

Geri was born in the Sydney suburb of Darlinghurst in 1961. Her style, sometimes compared to Joni Mitchell's, incorporated Celtic, soul, jazz-blues and folk music. She performed with international artists including Jean-Paul Wabotai, Abdul TJ Rokoto, the Fureys and Maria Forde.

Geri's compositions "The Return" and "Olliebod's Jig" (written with Mykl Losin) featured on the Celtic Paradise (Best of International Celtic Artists) album, and "The Return" was selected for inclusion on the ABC Airplay album vol.1 in 1998. This album was designed to collect some of the sought after and hard-to-find songs heard on ABC Local Radio and make them available to ABC listeners. Its success led to the annual release of ABC Airplay CDs. In Christmas 2009, Geri's "Dragonfly" from The Bastard's Daughter album was released on a double CD put together for charity by Rob Davies who organises the Ryedale Live music shows in North Yorkshire, UK. She and co-writer Mykl Lozin jointly won The Best Fiddle Composition Award Australia and NZ for their fiddle tune "Olliebod's Jig" at the Australian Inaugural Golden Fiddle Awards in 2005. She performed at the Melbourne Concert Hall, Melbourne's Continental Cafe and the Port Fairy Folk Festival.

Geri's music has been played on ABC Radio and international radio stations. She performed live on Bert Newton's Good Morning Australia and the Ernie Sigley show.

Geri toured the UK in 2008 and 2010.

== Albums ==
- 1986 Rising
- 1994 Janette Geri
- 1995 Describing the Sky
- 1996 Secret of the West Wind
- 1996 Castles
- 2007 Telling Tales
- 2008 The Bastard's Daughter
- 2016 Among the Flowers
- 2018 Among the Flowers (a totally new recording of the previous album with an added song)
