= Laura Wade-Gery =

British business executive (born 1965)

Laura Wade-Gery (born 1965) is a British business executive.

== Early life ==
Wade-Gery (daughter of the late Sir Robert Wade-Gery) was educated at Cheltenham Ladies' College and Magdalen College, Oxford, where she studied history and also achieved an ice-hockey blue. As a student she accompanied William Dalrymple on a journey across Asia which is described in Dalrymple's book In Xanadu. Dalrymple has said of Wade-Gery: “Stories of her feats of endurance were common currency; if half of them were true, she had by the age of 21 made Freya Stark look like a dilettante. ... When travelling with her I could never decide whether she reminded me more of Boadicea or Joyce Grenfell ..."

== Career ==
After working at Gemini Consulting and Kleinwort Benson, Wade-Gery joined Tesco in 1997 and rose to become chief executive of its online business. She was to have become commercial director of Tesco's non-food operation in 2011 but instead joined the board of Marks & Spencer as executive director of multi-channel e-commerce. She is also a member of the British Government's Digital Advisory Board, a trustee of the Royal Opera House, and a director of Snape Maltings Trading Limited.

On 1 August 2018 Laura Wade-Gery became a non-executive director of NHS Improvement.

Wade-Gery caused controversy by promoting a merger of national agencies of NHS England, NHSx, Education Health England and NHS Digital. The resulting merger projected a 40% reduction in headcount at a time that care services were under pressure from the aftermath of the pandemic response. Job losses were not relayed in dispatches in January 2023 in both the House of Commons or the House of Lords. Wade-Gery as of January 2023 held Executive Director positions for the British Land Company plc and directorships including Britten Pears Arts (Suffolk) and Legal and General Group. Whilst as executive director of NHS Digital, Wade-Gery presided through the merger process which was challenged by NHS Unions citing lack of consultation and constrained timeframes. Following the merger Wade-Gery has taken a non-executive role for NHS England.

On 15th October 2023 Laura became the Chair of the Board of Governors at Moorfields Eye Hospital but resigned on 3rd March 2025
