= Dragoslava Gerić =

Serbian and Yugoslavian basketball player

Personal information
- Born: 4 August 1947 Belgrade, SFR Yugoslavia
- Died: 21 March 2011 (aged 63) Belgrade, Serbia

Career information
- Playing career: 1961–19??

Career history
- 1961–1970: Crvena zvezda

Dragoslava "Dragana" Gerić (Serbian Cyrillic: Драгослава Герић, 7 August 1947 – 21 March 2011) was a Serbian and Yugoslavian former female basketball player.
