= Theodore Wade-Gery =

British classical scholar (1888–1972)

Theodore Wade-Gery MC FBA
- Born: Henry Theodore Wade-Gery; 2 April 1888; Shefford, Bedfordshire, England
- Died: 2 January 1972 (aged 83); Oxford, England
- Occupation: Academic
- Title: Wykeham Professor of Ancient History (1939–1953)

Academic work
- Discipline: Classics
- Sub-discipline: Ancient history; epigraphy
- Institutions: Wadham College, Oxford; New College, Oxford; Merton College, Oxford; Princeton University

Henry Theodore Wade-Gery, MC, FBA (2 April 1888 – 2 January 1972), known as Theodore Wade-Gery or H. T. Wade-Gery, was a classical scholar, historian and epigrapher. From 1939 to 1953, he was Wykeham Professor of Ancient History at the University of Oxford.

== Life ==
Born into a long-established Bedfordshire family, Wade-Gery was educated at Winchester College, a contemporary of Arnold J. Toynbee and R.M.Y. Gleadowe, and at New College, Oxford, which he left with a First in Classical Moderations in 1911. After a short spell in the Civil Service he was offered a tutorial fellowship in 1914 at Wadham College, Oxford. Almost immediately however he left for military service in the First World War in the army on the Western Front, during which he was awarded the MC.

After the end of the war Wade-Gery returned to Wadham, eventually becoming Sub-Warden. He remained at Wadham until 1939, when on his election as Wykeham Professor of Ancient History he became a Fellow of New College. In 1941 he was elected a Fellow of the British Academy. He retired from his Chair in 1953 and was offered a five-year Research Fellowship at Merton College, two years of which he spent at Princeton. For the next ten years or so he continued to travel and to write (his last publication was in 1966) until after a few years of declining health he died of a heart attack in 1972.

== Works ==
In 1915 three of Wade-Gery's poems were published in that year's Oxford Poetry volume, in which work by J. R. R. Tolkien also appeared. After his safe return from the war he published "Terpsichore and Other Poems", a collection of his poetry, in 1922, but future publications were devoted to his academic work and especially to epigraphy. He is often cited by classical scholars for his suggestion that the Greek alphabet was adapted from Phoenician script in the 8th century BC with the express purpose of recording Homer's monumental epics.

His writing was mostly in the form of articles in learned journals. His principal publications were:

- Pindar: Pythian Odes, 1928 (Nonesuch Press), jointly with Maurice Bowra;
- The Athenian Tribute Lists (4 vols), 1939–53 (American School of Classical Studies at Athens), as a joint author with Benjamin D. Meritt and Malcolm F. McGregor;
- The Poet of the Iliad, 1952 (CUP), the published form of his J.H. Gray lectures given at Cambridge in 1949;
- Essays in Greek History, 1958 (Blackwell).

== Family ==
Wade-Gery married archaeologist Vivian Whitfield (1897–1988) in 1928. They had one son, Robert Wade-Gery (later Sir Robert), who was born in 1929. Wade-Gery's earlier polyamorous relationship with the writer Naomi Mitchison ended with his marriage to Whitfield.

== Sources ==
- Obituary and portrait photograph in the Proceedings of the British Academy 1974
- "Professor H. T. Wade-Gery". Obituary. The Times. No. 58365. London. 3 January 1972. p. 12.
