= Tom and Jerry (guitarists) =

American band

Tom and Jerry was a guitar duo of the early 1960s in the United States, consisting of Tommy Tomlinson and Jerry Kennedy.

They recorded instrumentals on the Mercury Records label. Their best known single was "Golden Wildwood Flower" in 1961.

They released four albums, with a general rock and roll theme:

- Guitar's Greatest Hits (1961)
- Guitars Play the Sound of Ray Charles (1962)
- Guitar's Greatest Hits volume 2 (1962)
- Surfin' Hootenanny (1963)
