= Geri X =

American singer-songwriter (born 1989)

- Born: Gergana Petrova Micheva; 6 May 1989 (age 37); Pleven, Bulgaria
- Origin: St. Petersburg, Florida, U.S.
- Genres: Psych blues, folk rock, blues rock, alternative rock, lo-fi garage rock
- Instruments: Vocals, guitar, piano, percussion
- Years active: 2005–present
- Label: Multiple
- Website: www.gerixmusic.com

Geri X (born 6 May 1989) is a Bulgarian-born singer-songwriter whose music shows influences of several genres including folk, psychedelic rock, Americana, and post-rock.

== Early life ==
Geri X was born in Bulgaria, then grew up in Pleven and Versailles.

== Career ==
In 2001, Geri X began her ascent to become one of Tampa Bay's most beloved artists. She has won Creative Loafing's Best Singer Songwriter award twice. In 2011, Geri X was named "Best of Indie" in the Bulgarian edition of Rolling Stone’s "Best of Rock.”

Geri provides vocals in a duet with former Kinks lead guitarist Dave Davies in the song "When I First Saw You" on his album It Will Be Me, which was released in June 2013 by Cleopatra Records.

== Discography ==
=== Notable studio albums ===
Year	Album
2005	"Radioactive Drool"
2005	"Treachery"
2006	"a bit worried today"
2006	"FEVER"
2006	"Can't make you happy"
2007	"Anthems of a Mended Heart"
2007	"Black Anthems"
2008	"The Bedroom Sessions"
2009	"The Bedroom Sessions Vol. 2: The Naked Truth"
2010	"Whiskey and Cigarettes"
2011	"The Kid"
2012	Work Is The Wolf
2013	White Light
2014	Loyalty Sport
2015	"The Low Road"
2019	"The Lost Sessions"
