= Tyson Jerry =

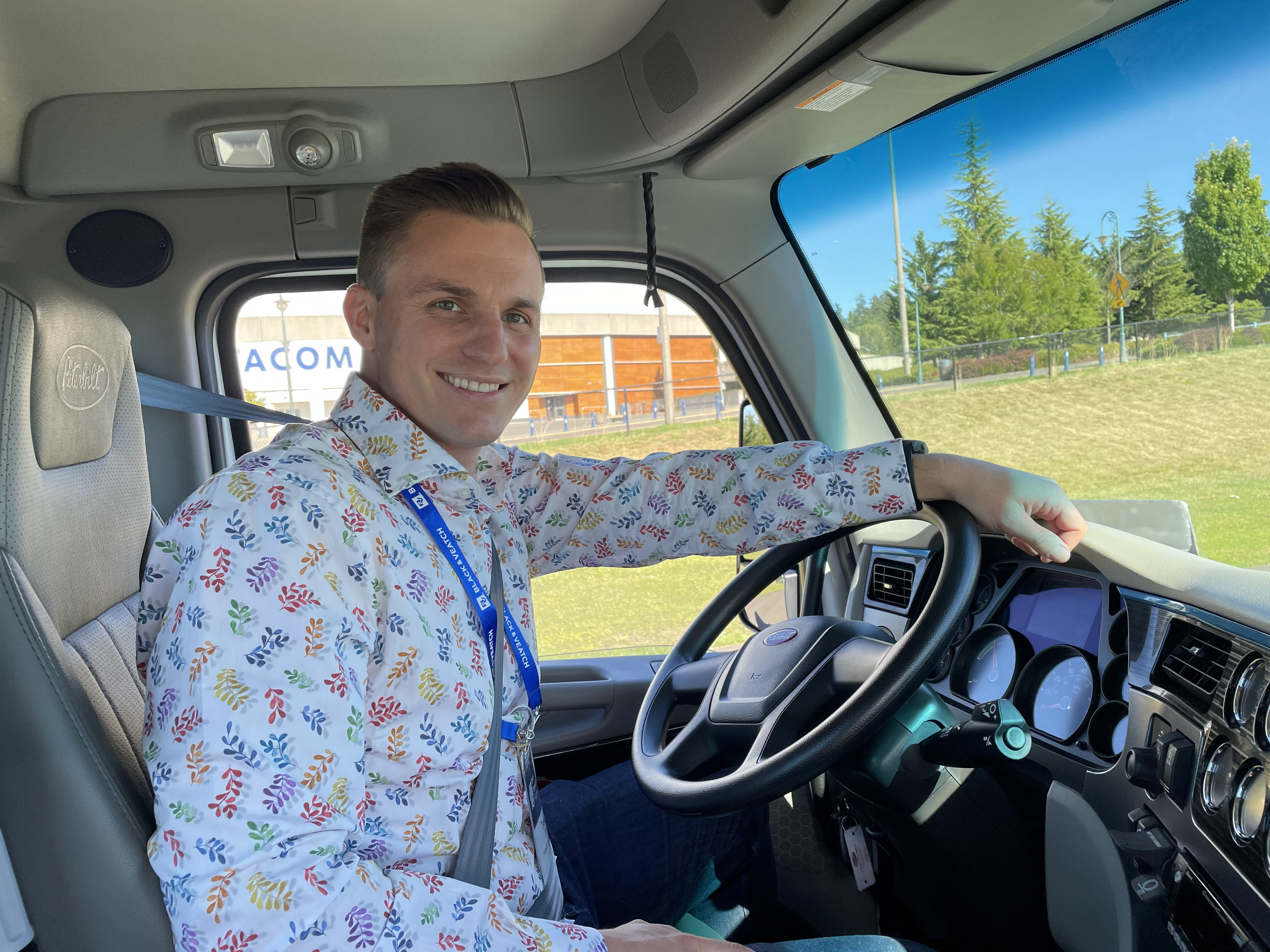
- Tyson Jerry
- Born: October 23, 1983 (age 42); Orangeville, Ontario, Canada
- Occupation: Sustainable transportation professional
- Known for: Guinness World Record: longest journey by car using alternative fuel

Tyson Jerry (born October 23, 1983) is a Canadian Guinness World Record holder, environmentalist, and speaker best known for his work promoting alternative energy and sustainable transportation. He holds the Guinness record for the longest journey by car using alternative fuel, set during a 2009–2010 expedition.

== Early life and education ==
Jerry was born in Orangeville, Ontario, and raised in Wyevale. He attended Wyevale Central Public School before graduating from Elmvale District High School. To support his post-secondary studies, he worked in the silviculture industry, planting over one million trees and supervising the planting of an additional 5 million during his tenure as a tree-planter.

== Driven to Sustain and Campaign Origins ==
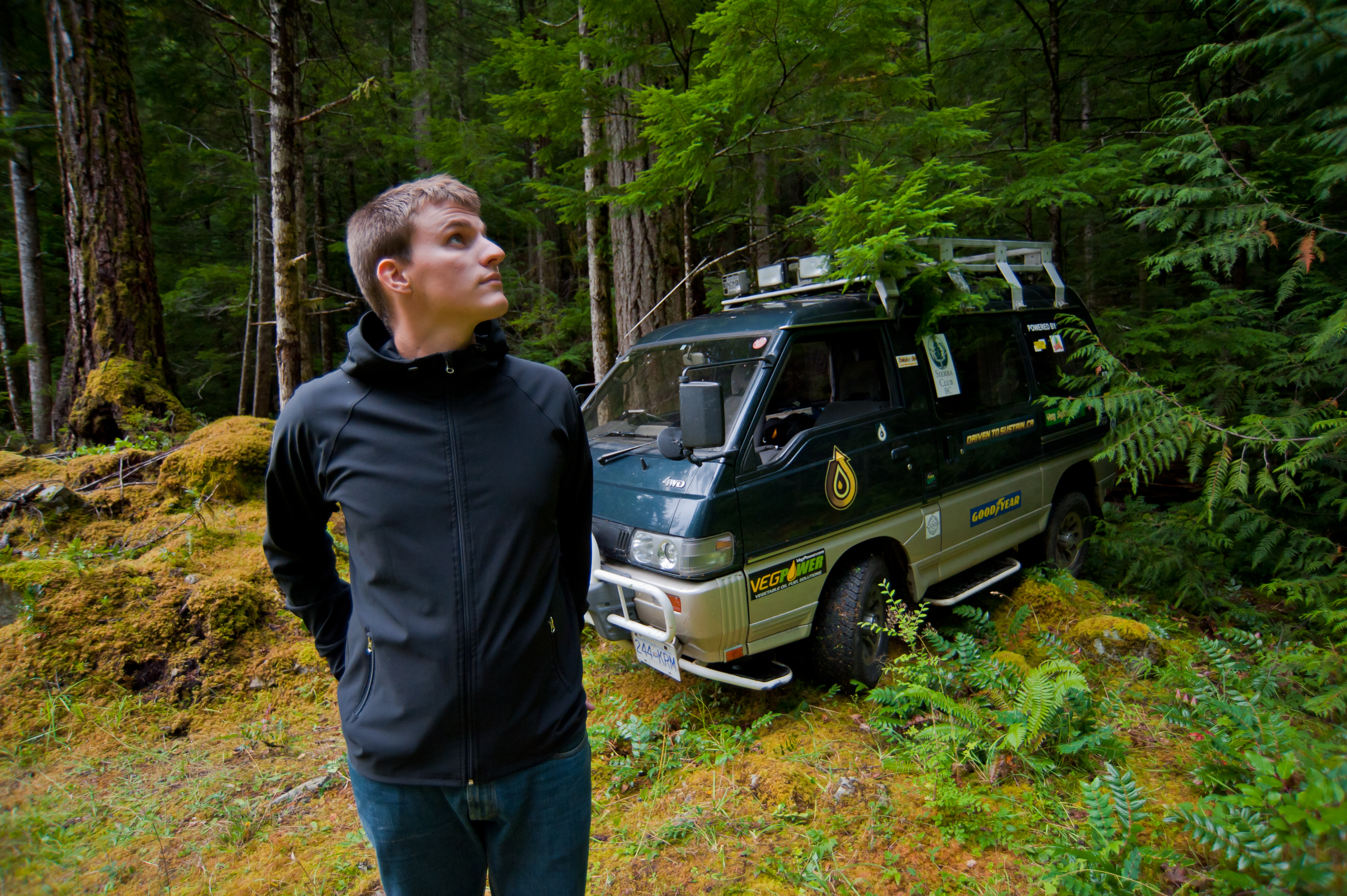
Tyson Jerry with the Guinness World Record-breaking Mitsubishi Delica used for the 2009–2010 expedition

In 2008, Tyson Jerry co-founded Driven to Sustain, a non-profit sustainability campaign created in partnership with the Sierra Club of British Columbia and supported by Ontario’s Ministry of the Environment.

The campaign aimed to promote the use of alternative fuels and engage students across North America in climate action and environmental education.

Central to the initiative was the development of the "Sustainable High Schools Kit"—a free, downloadable curriculum co-designed with Sierra Club educators. The program encouraged student-led efforts to reduce carbon footprints and compete in a continent-wide sustainability challenge. To amplify its educational message, the campaign incorporated a bold expedition to demonstrate the real-world viability of waste-based fuels.

== First Attempt (2008) ==
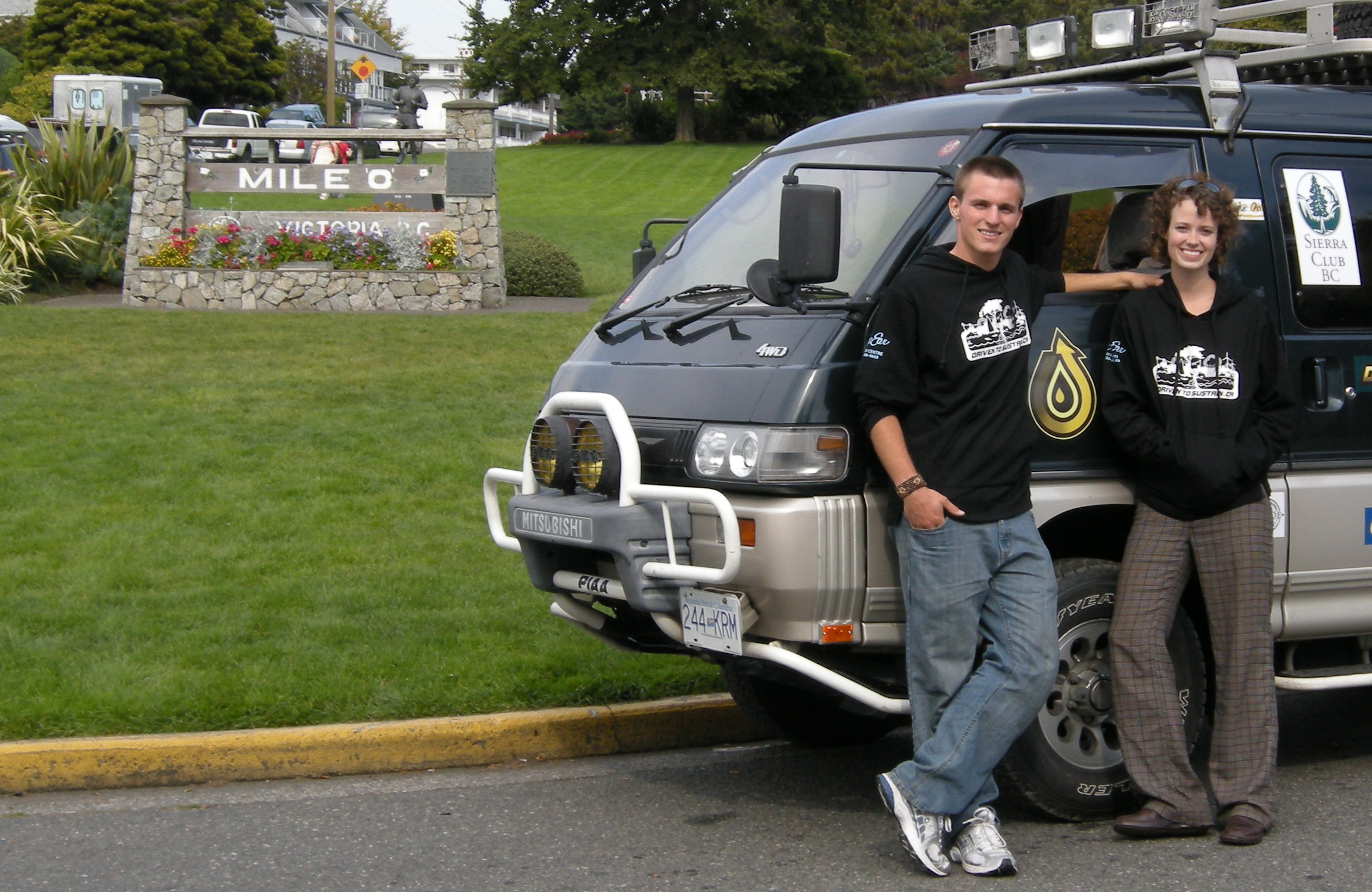
Tyson Jerry and Cloe Whittaker at Mile Zero in Victoria, British Columbia, on October 1, 2008, at the start of the Driven to Sustain expedition, standing in front of their modified Mitsubishi Delica van.

On October 1, 2008, Jerry and his teammate, Cloe Whittaker, launched the Driven to Sustain expedition from Mile Zero in Victoria, British Columbia. Driving a 1993 Mitsubishi Delica van modified to run on biodiesel and waste vegetable oil, they embarked on a cross-continental journey intended to break the Guinness World Record for the longest journey by car using alternative fuel.

During the journey, the team visited numerous schools and community events, using the expedition as a platform to educate youth on renewable energy and ethical consumption. After covering 19,697 kilometres (12,239 miles) through Canada and the eastern United States, their journey was cut short near Columbia, South Carolina, due to a mechanical failure. Despite not reaching the record, the trip was seen as a proof-of-concept for long-distance sustainable travel.

== Guinness World Record Journey (2009–2010) ==
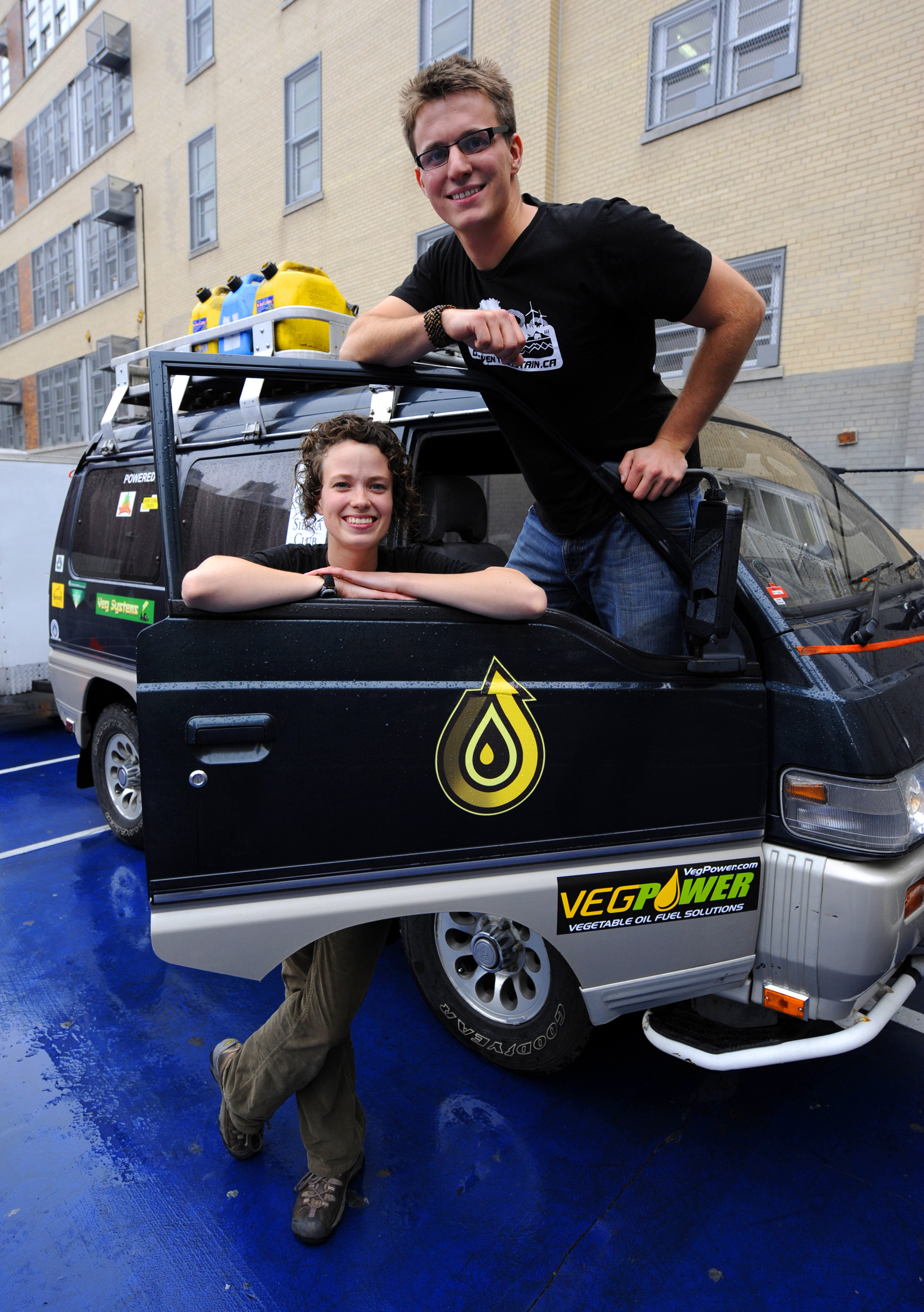
Canadians Cloe Whittaker and Tyson Jerry in New York City after surpassing the previous Guinness World Record for the longest journey by car on alternative fuel. As part of their “Driven to Sustain” project, they spoke to students at Robert Wagner Middle School while driving a van powered entirely by used vegetable oil.

Following extensive repairs to the vehicle, Jerry relaunched the expedition solo on November 15, 2009, resuming the route from South Carolina. Over several months, he traveled through nearly every Canadian province, most U.S. states, and parts of Mexico, collecting waste vegetable oil from restaurants to use as fuel.

On May 4, 2010, Jerry completed the journey in Vancouver, British Columbia, having driven 48,535.5 kilometres (30,158.5 miles)—surpassing the previous Guinness World Record by more than 10,000 kilometres.

A map of North America depicting Tyson Jerry and Cloe Whittaker’s two expeditions as part of the Driven to Sustain campaign. The purple line shows the first attempt in 2008, which covered 19,696 km before ending in South Carolina due to mechanical failure. The red line traces the record-breaking second journey completed in 2010, spanning 48,535 km across Canada, the United States, and Mexico using only alternative fuels (biodiesel and waste vegetable oil).

Throughout the expedition, Jerry delivered sustainability presentations at schools and community organizations, reaching more than 10,000 students. The campaign received widespread national and international media coverage, generating over 100 million media impressions through outlets such as CBC, Reuters, NBC, Fox News, and others.

== Fuel System and Conversion Technology ==
The 1993 Mitsubishi Delica L300 used for the expedition was outfitted with a two-tank fuel conversion system to allow operation on straight vegetable oil (SVO) or waste vegetable oil (WVO). This system retained the original diesel tank (used for biodiesel in this case) and added a 200-litre auxiliary tank for SVO. A key requirement of such systems is fuel temperature management: vegetable oil must be heated to reduce its viscosity and enable proper atomization in diesel engines.

Engine coolant heat was utilized to warm the vegetable oil via heat exchangers, fuel lines, and a dedicated heated filter unit. The fuel passed through a hose-in-hose system, heated filter, and an electric fuel heater installed just before the injection pump, ensuring the SVO reached at least 70–80 °C (158–176 °F)—close to the engine’s coolant temperature of approximately 90 °C (195 °F).

Fuel switching was managed by solenoid valves and a computer controller. The engine always started and shut down using biodiesel from the stock tank. Once the engine coolant and vegetable oil reached the necessary temperature threshold (typically around 77–80 °C), the system switched to SVO for the remainder of the drive. Prior to shutdown, the system purged the SVO from the lines by switching back to biodiesel, preventing injector coking and cold-start issues. This procedure enabled the van to operate on WVO for approximately 99% of its journey while maintaining engine reliability.

== Career ==
Following the Driven to Sustain expedition, Jerry continued to advance sustainable transportation through his professional career. He spent several years working on projects aimed at reducing carbon emissions in commercial vehicle fleets.

In 2016, he joined FortisBC, a provincial energy utility in British Columbia, to focus on renewable natural gas and low-carbon transportation initiatives. Jerry later transitioned into a leadership role as Manager of Hydrogen Infrastructure & Investment within FortisBC’s Low Carbon Transportation program, concentrating on accelerating the adoption of hydrogen fuel technology in medium- and heavy-duty vehicle (MHDV) fleets. In this capacity, he works on expanding hydrogen refueling infrastructure and integrating zero-emission hydrogen vehicles into commercial operations, helping to drive the transition to cleaner transportation in the trucking and transit industries.

Throughout his career, Jerry has remained a vocal advocate for sustainable innovation. He frequently speaks at conferences and educational institutions, sharing his experiences with alternative fuels and encouraging businesses and communities to embrace low-carbon technologies. By leveraging his Guinness World Record platform and industry expertise, he continues to champion initiatives that reduce greenhouse gas emissions in transportation and inspire broader adoption of renewable energy.

== Personal life ==
Jerry resides in Metro Vancouver, British Columbia. He has two children. Publicly available interviews and profiles note his interest in outdoor activities and environmental sustainability.

== Gallery ==
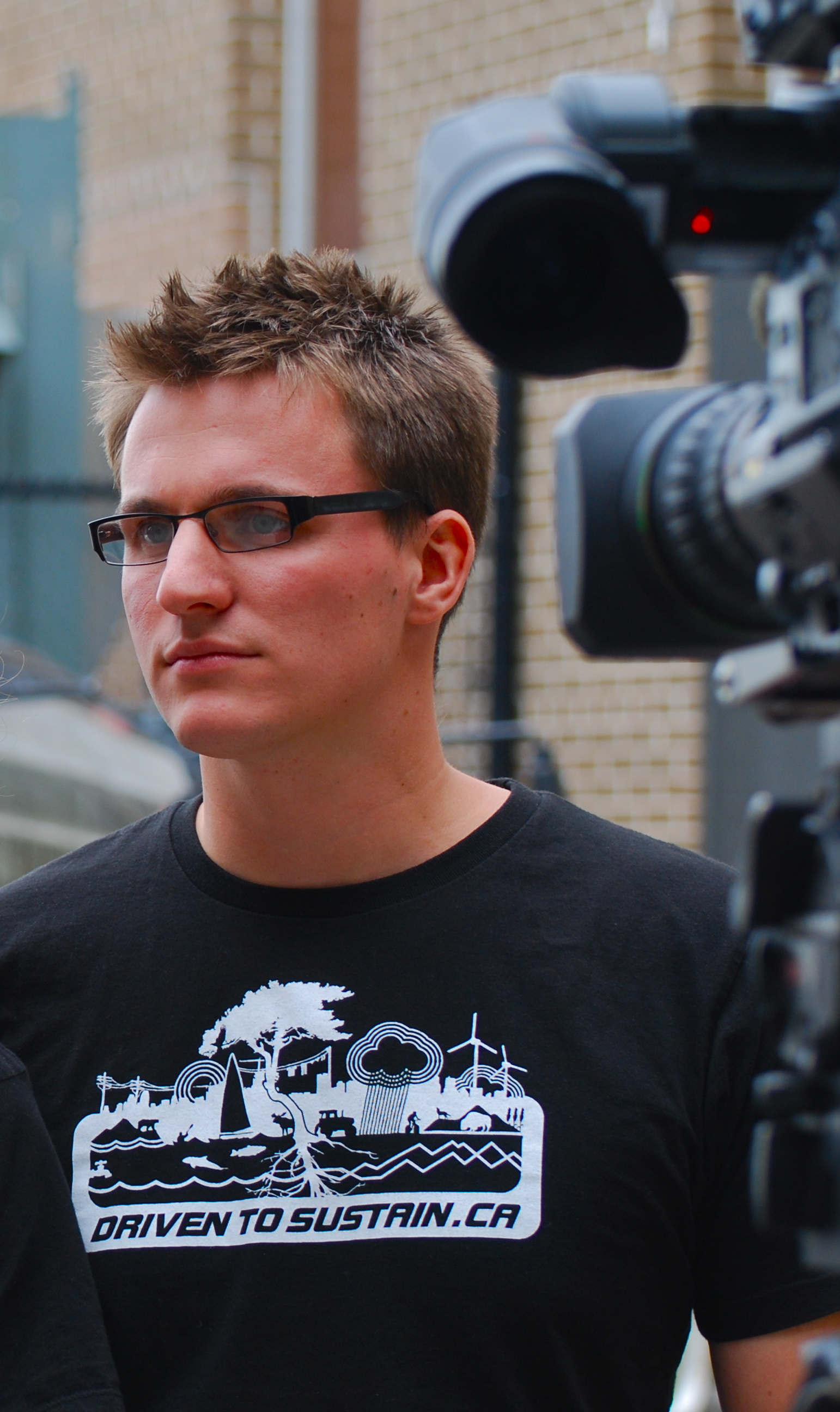
Tyson Jerry interviewed by CTV Toronto during the Driven to Sustain sustainability expedition.

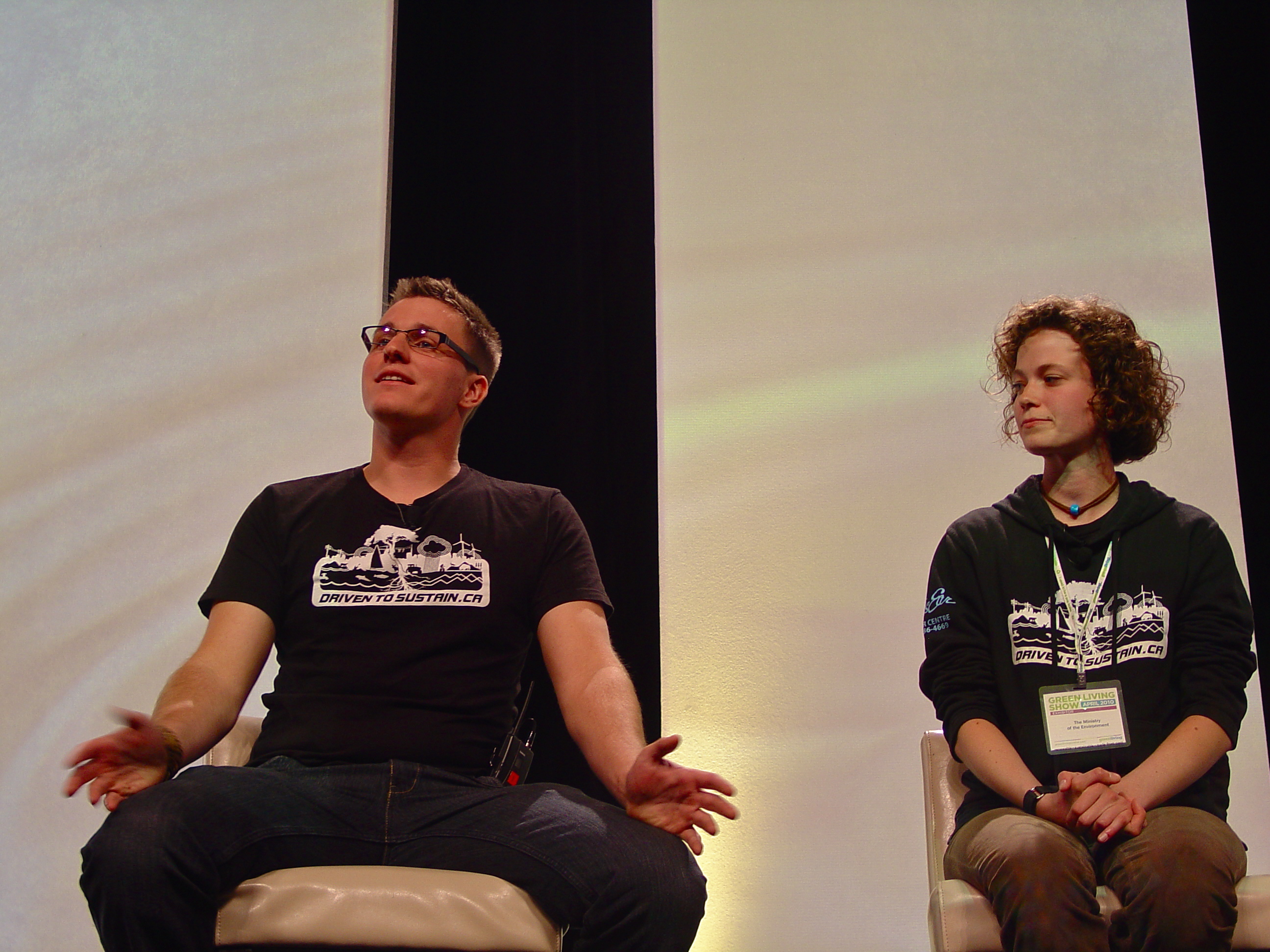
Driven to Sustain co-founders Tyson Jerry and Cloe Whittaker speaking on stage at the Green Living Show in Toronto, 2010.

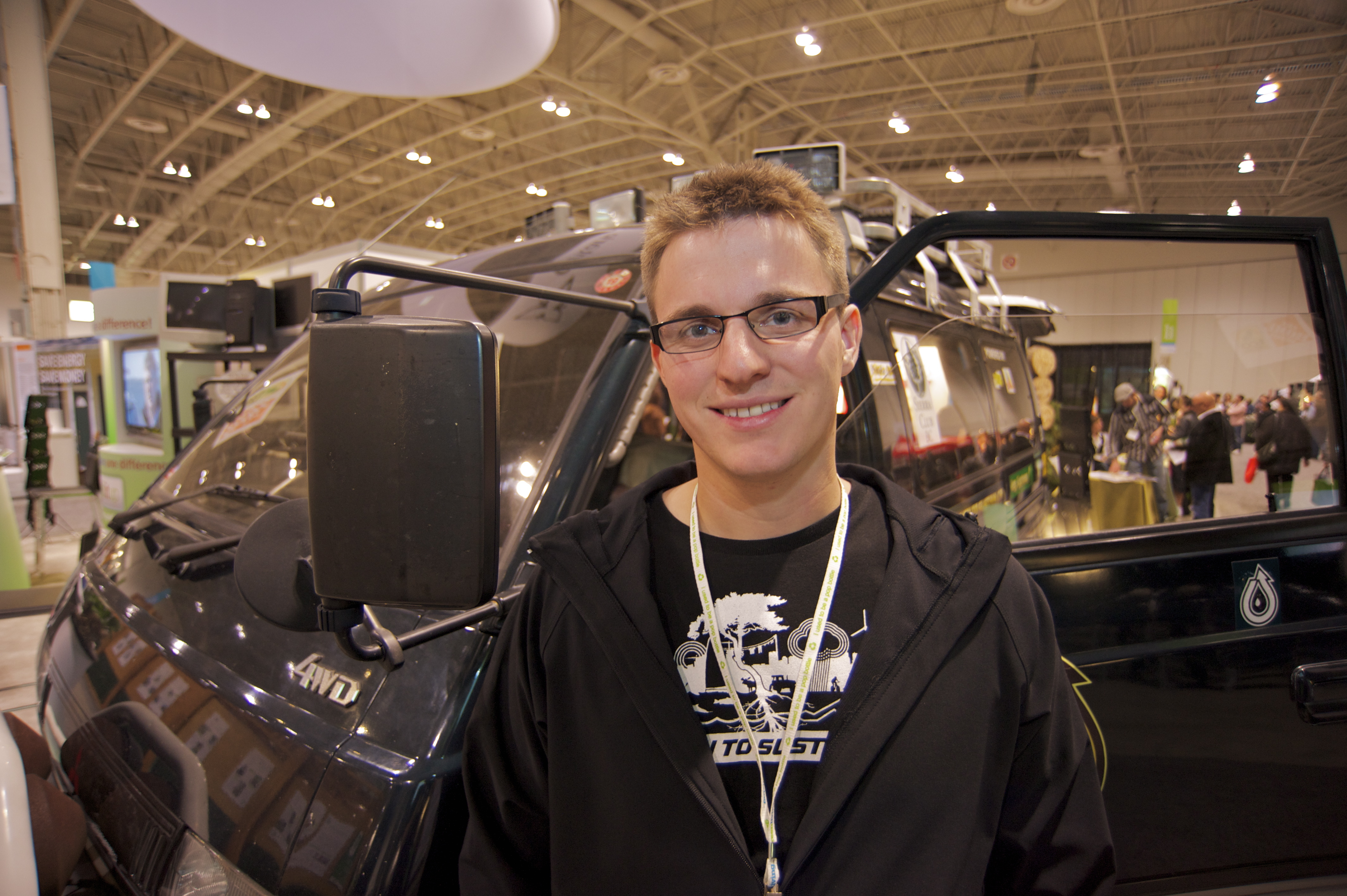
Tyson Jerry at the Green Living Show in Ontario, showcased by the Ministry of the Environment during the Driven to Sustain sustainability campaign.

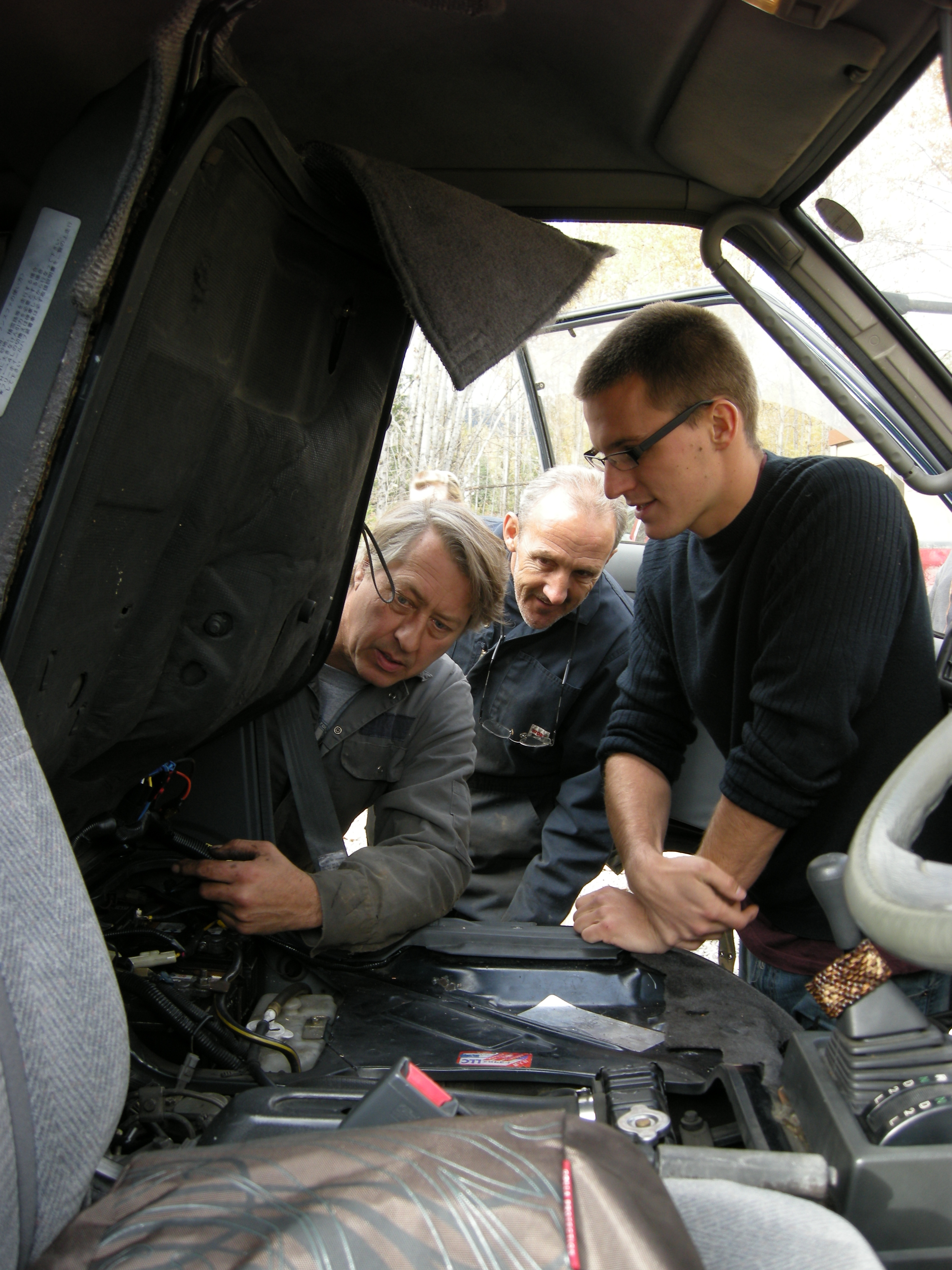
Tyson Jerry and mechanics inspecting the custom fuel system of the Driven to Sustain van in Upper Laberge, Yukon.

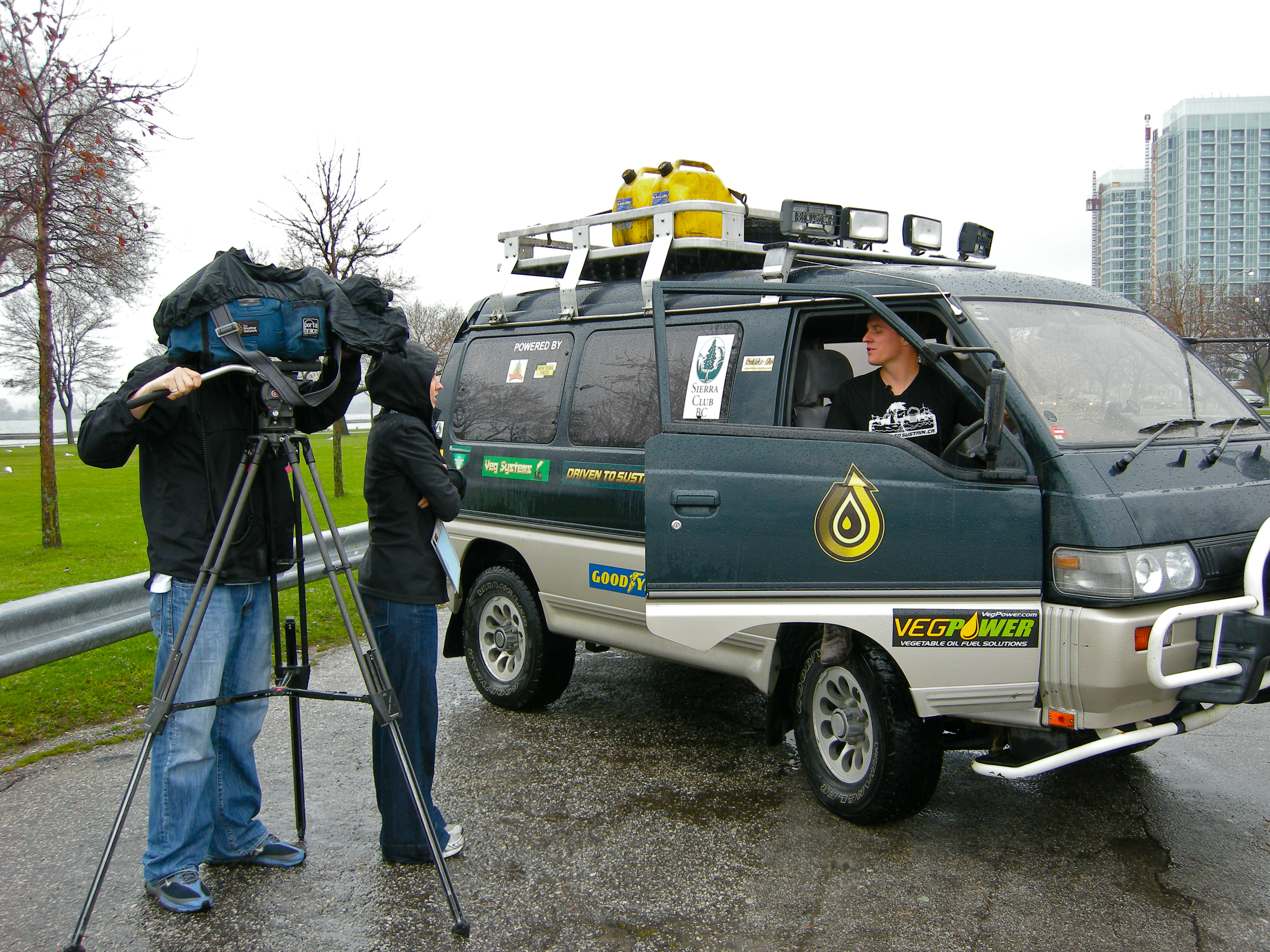
Tyson Jerry interviewed in Toronto during the Guinness World Record campaign using biodiesel and waste vegetable oil.

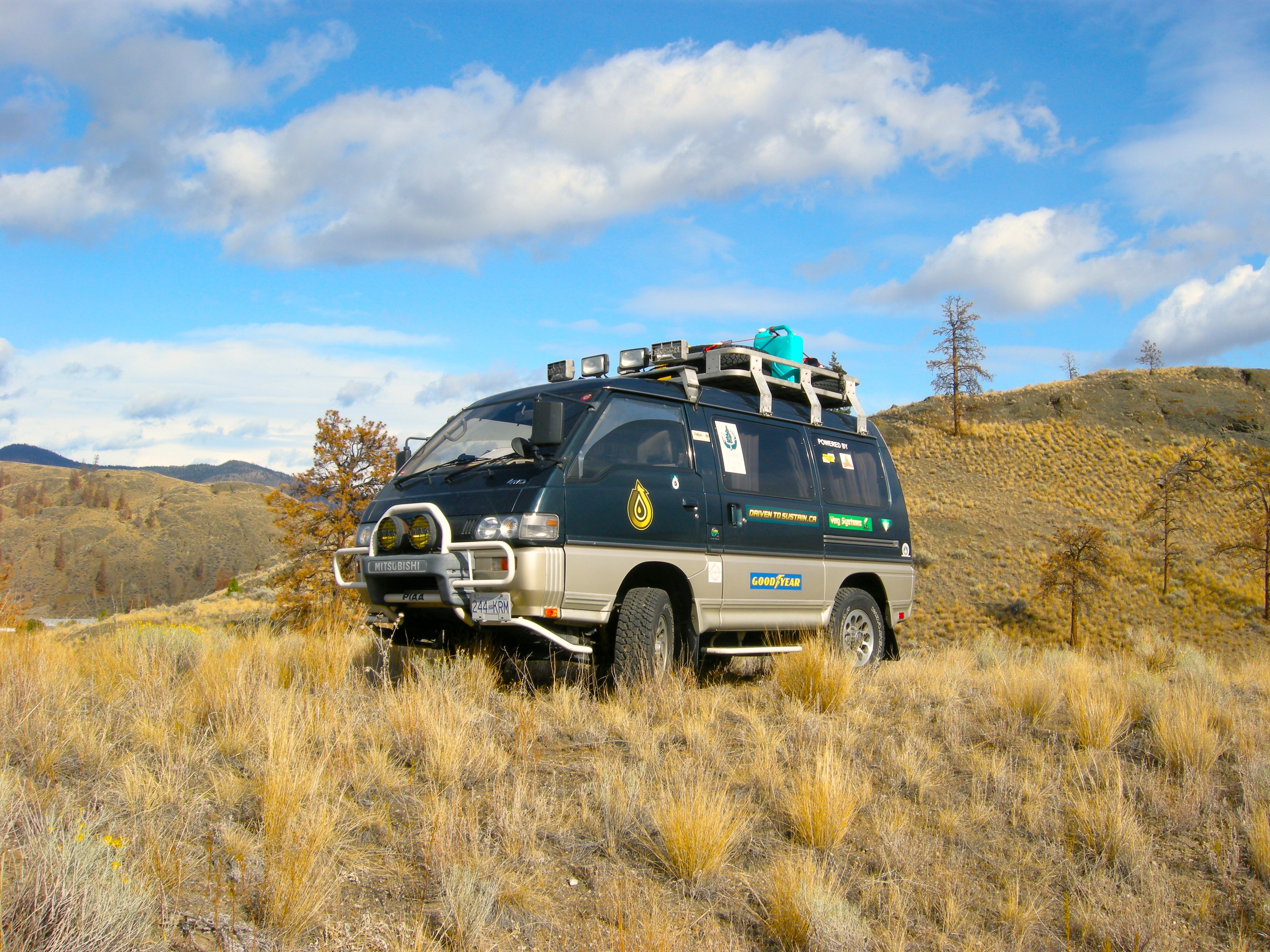
Mitsubishi Delica L30 used in the Driven to Sustain expedition, parked in the backcountry of British Columbia.

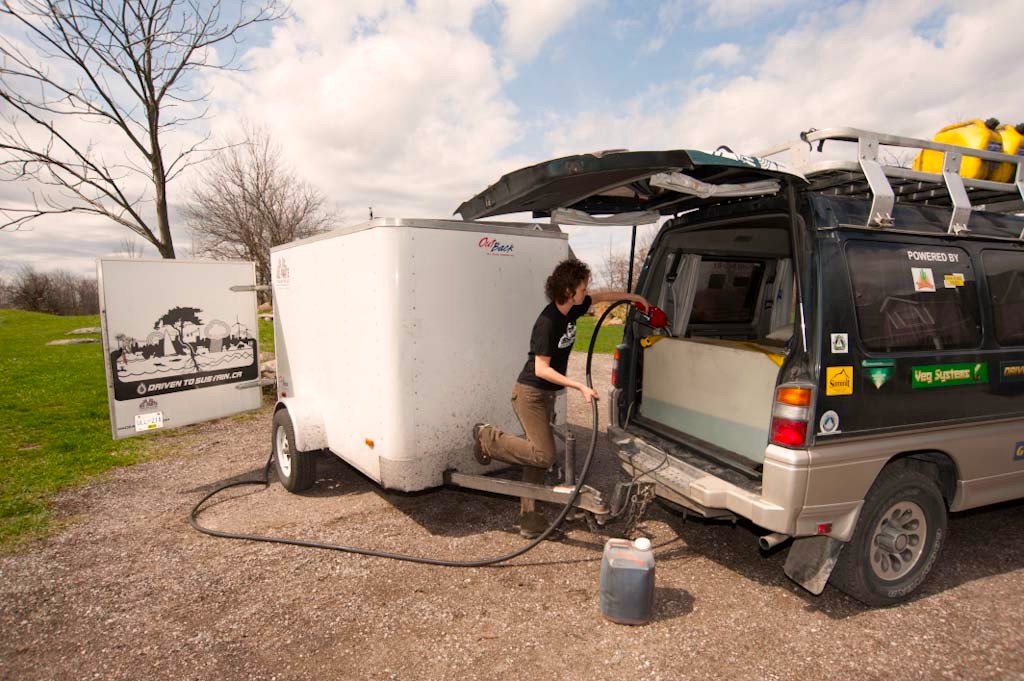
Cloe fills the secondary fuel tank with vegetable oil fuel processed in the trailer during the Driven to Sustain expedition.

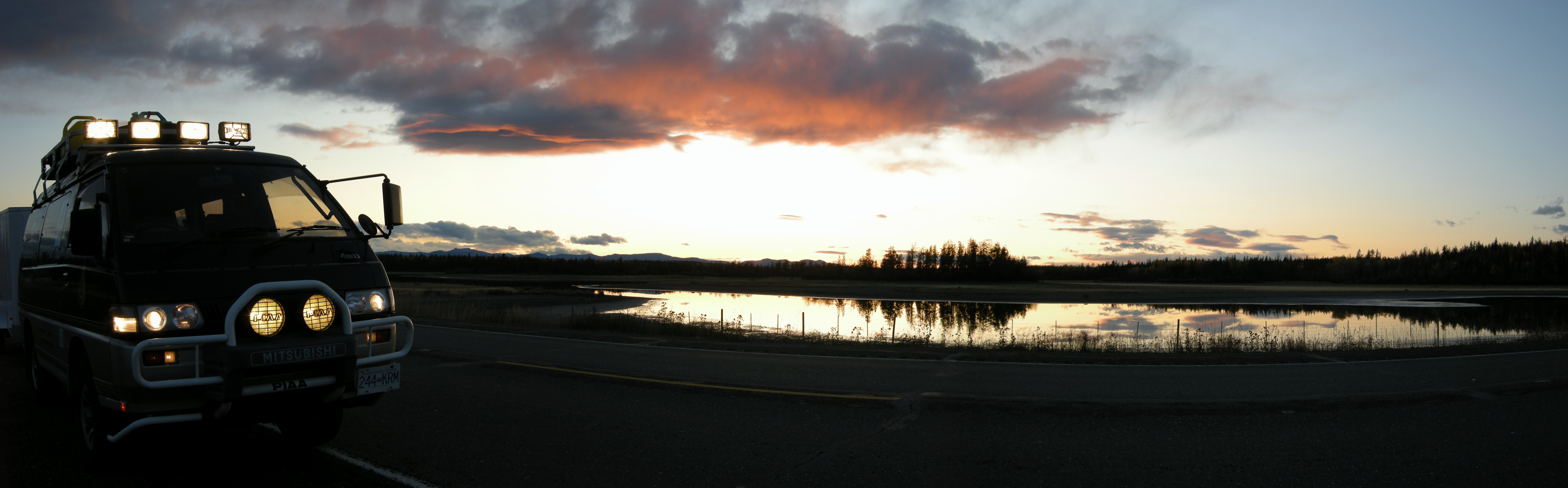
The Driven to Sustain van parked roadside at sunset near 70 Mile House, BC, during the sustainability expedition.

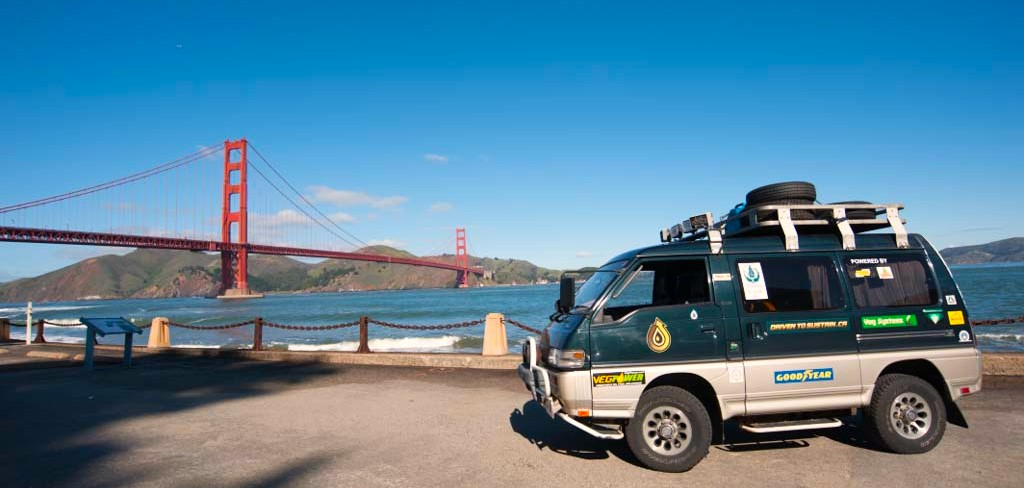
The Driven to Sustain van parked along the San Francisco waterfront with the Golden Gate Bridge in the background.

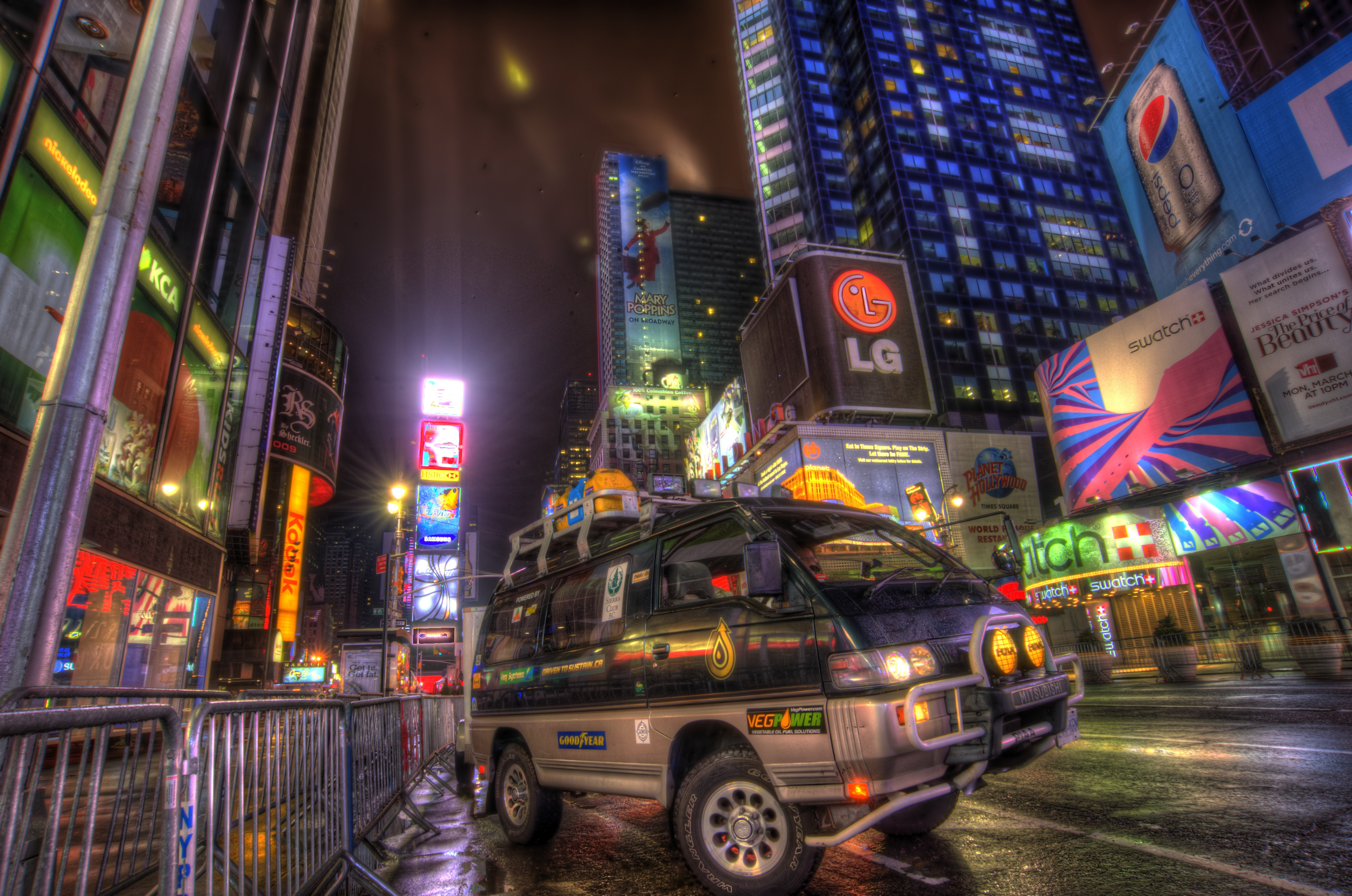
The Driven to Sustain van photographed in Times Square during the North American sustainability expedition.

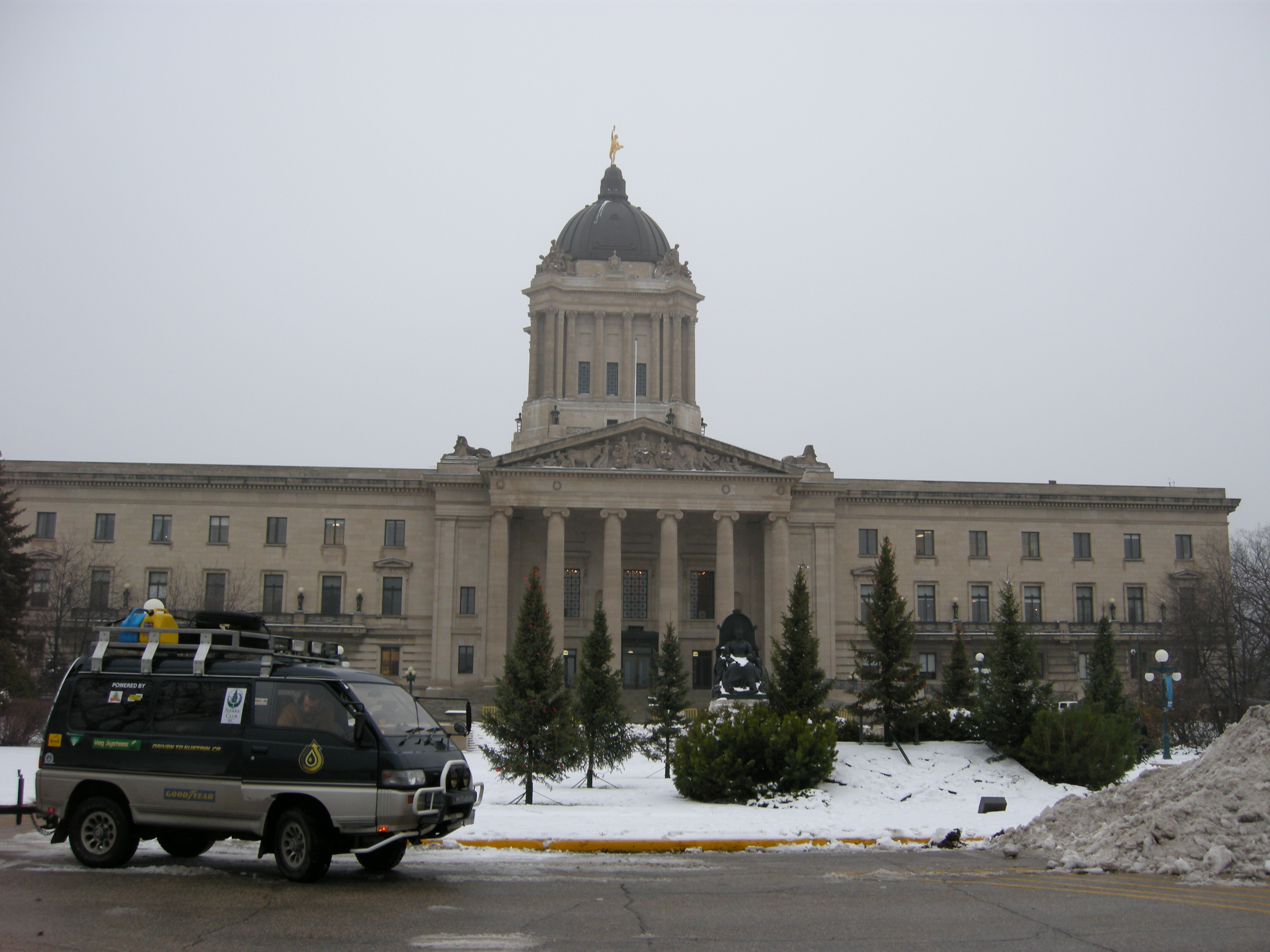
The Driven to Sustain van parked in front of the Manitoba Legislative Building during its sustainability tour.

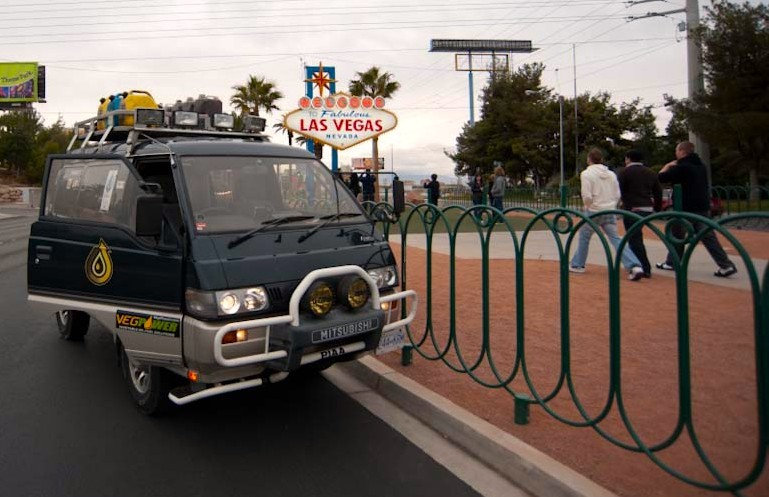
The Driven to Sustain van parked in front of the iconic “Welcome to Fabulous Las Vegas” sign during its cross-continental expedition.

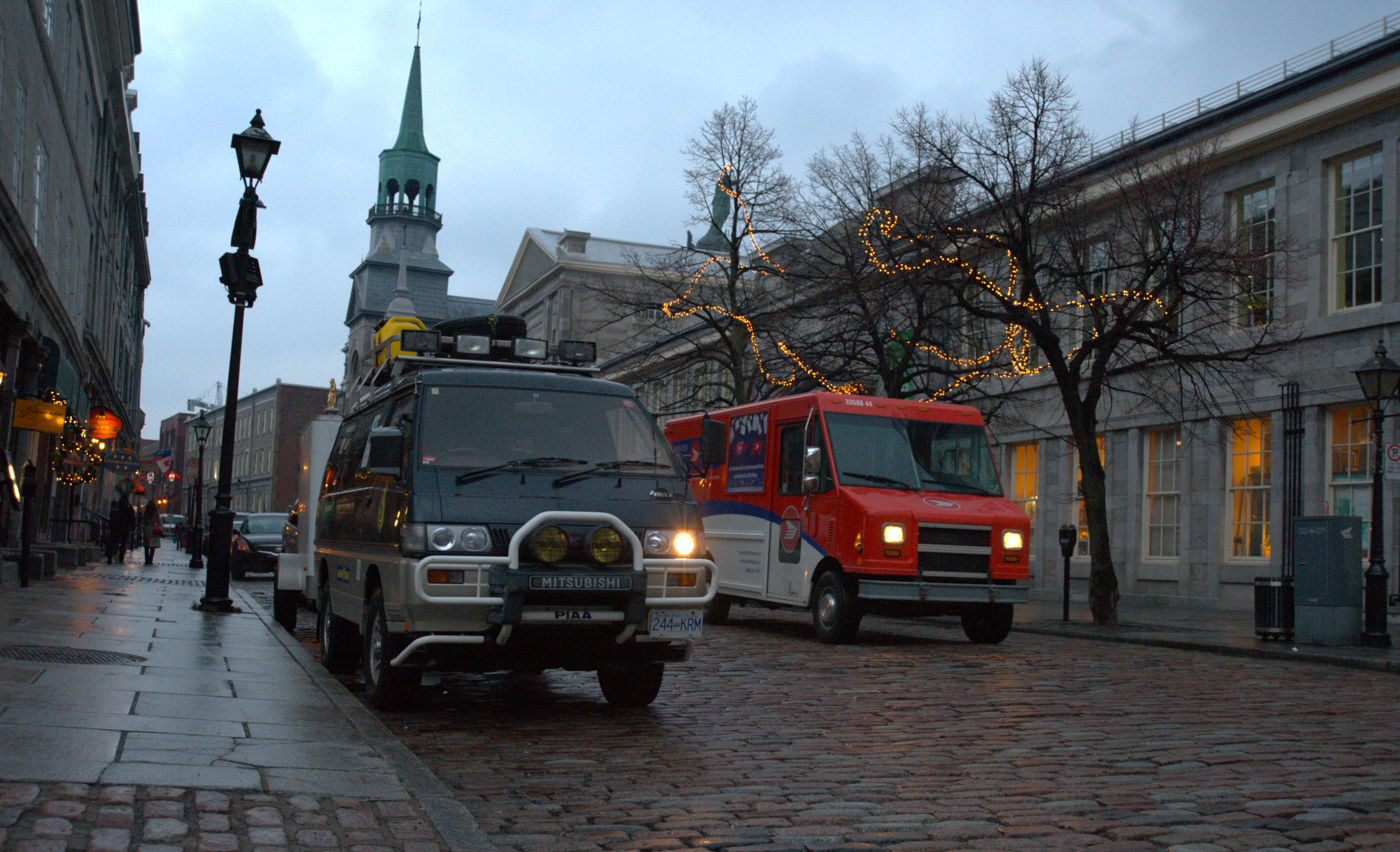
The Driven to Sustain van parked on a cobblestone street in Old Montreal, Quebec.

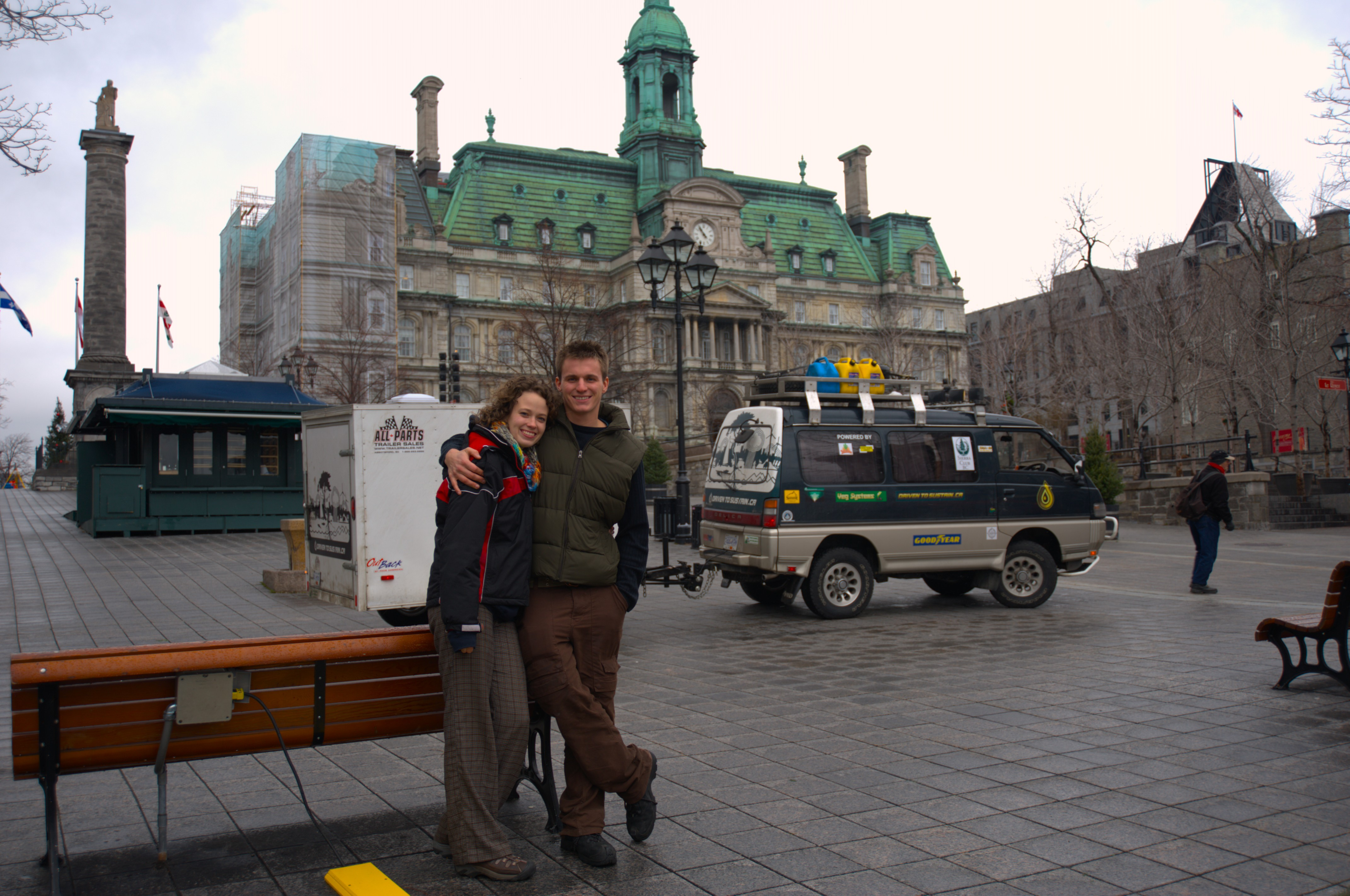
Tyson Jerry and Cloe Whittaker of the Driven to Sustain team outside Montreal City Hall during their cross-continental sustainability campaign.

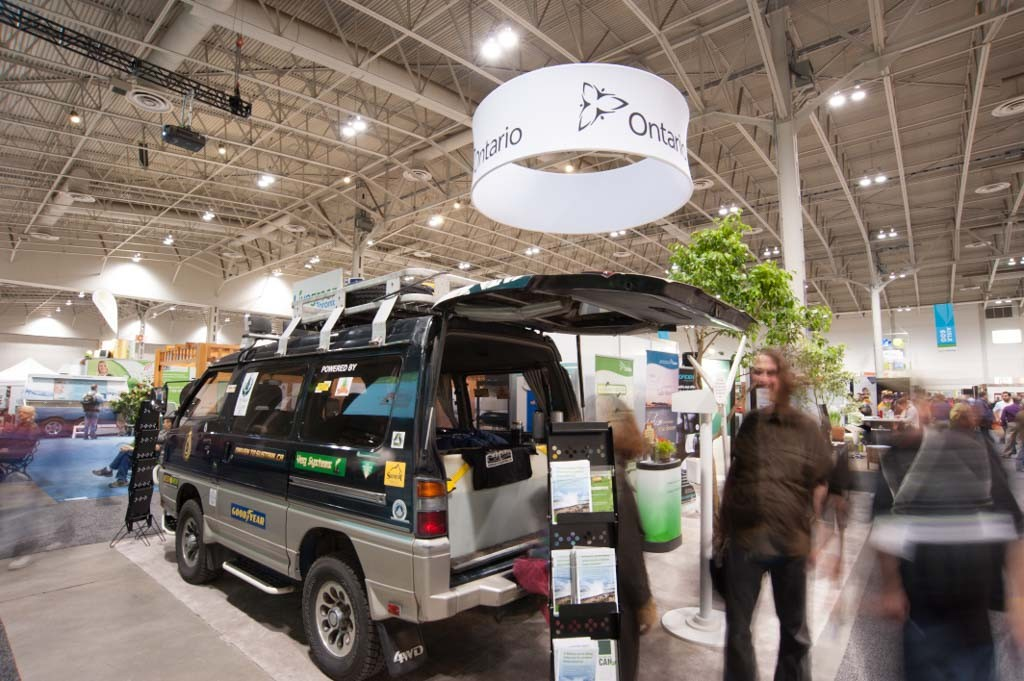
Driven to Sustain van featured at the Ontario Ministry of the Environment’s exhibit during the 2010 Green Living Show in Toronto.

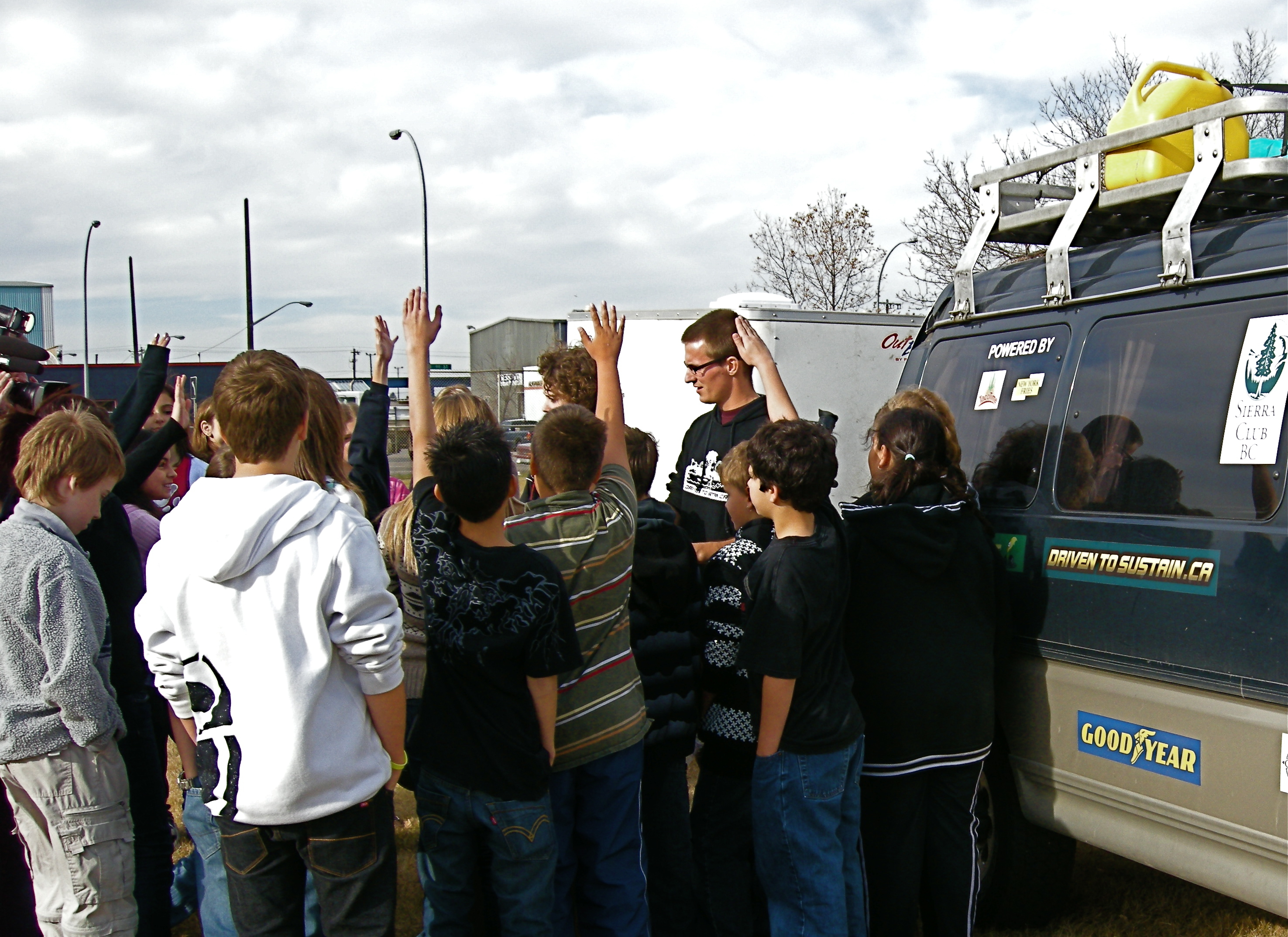
Tyson Jerry speaks to students about renewable fuels during a school visit on the Driven to Sustain tour.

== See also ==
- Alternative fuel vehicle
- Guinness World Records
- Sustainable transportation
