= Robert Wade-Gery =

British diplomat

Sir Robert Wade-Gery KCMG KCVO (22 April 1929 – 16 February 2015) was a British diplomat who was High Commissioner to India 1982–87.

== Biography ==
Wade-Gery was born in Oxford on 22 April 1929. His father, Theodore Wade-Gery was an ancient historian and fellow of Wadham College, Oxford and his mother was Vivian Whitfield, an archaeologist.

Wade-Gery was educated at Winchester College and New College, Oxford, where he achieved a double first class degree. He then passed the examination to become a Fellow of All Souls 1951–58; subsequently he was a "Fifty-Pound Fellow" 1959–73 and a "Two-Year Fellow" 1987–89; he was an Honorary Fellow from 2011 until his death in 2015.

On 16 June 1962, he married Sarah Marris and they had two children together. He died, after having a stroke, on 16 February 2015 in Gloucestershire.

Wade-Gery was appointed CMG in the Queen's Birthday Honours of 1979, knighted KCMG in the New Year Honours of 1983 and given the additional knighthood of KCVO in November 1983.

== Career ==
Exempted from national service due to poor eyesight, he joined the Foreign Service in 1951 and served at Bonn, Tel Aviv and Saigon as well as posts at the Foreign Office (later the Foreign and Commonwealth Office). His Saigon posting was during the Vietnam War, including a period where the American Embassy across the road was captured by the Viet Cong and his wife and daughter had to be evacuated.

He was Minister at Madrid 1973–77 and at Moscow 1977–79, deputy Secretary of the Cabinet 1979–82, and High Commissioner to India 1982–87. He then left the Diplomatic Service and was a director of Barclays Capital 1987–99. He was a member and treasurer (1991–2005) of the International Institute for Strategic Studies, and was chairman of the governors of the School of Oriental and African Studies, University of London (1990–1999).

Diplomatic posts
Preceded by Sir John Thomson	High Commissioner to India; 1982–1987	Succeeded by Sir David Goodall
