= Gary =

Gary may refer to:

- Gary (given name), a common masculine given name, including a list of people and fictional characters with the name

== Places ==
Iran

- Gary, Iran, Sistan and Baluchestan Province

United States

- Gary (Tampa), Florida
- Gary, Indiana
- Gary, Maryland
- Gary, Minnesota
- Gary, South Dakota
- Gary, West Virginia
- Gary – New Duluth, a neighborhood in Duluth, Minnesota
- Gary Air Force Base, San Marcos, Texas
- Gary City, Texas

== Ships ==
- USS Gary (DE-61), a destroyer escort launched in 1943
- USS Gary (CL-147), scheduled to be a light cruiser, but canceled prior to construction in 1945
- USS Gary (FFG-51), a frigate, commissioned in 1984
- USS Thomas J. Gary (DE-326), a destroyer escort commissioned in 1943

== People ==
- Gary (given name), a common masculine given name, including a list of people and fictional characters with the name
- Gary (surname), including a list of people with the name
- Gary (rapper), South Korean rapper and entertainer
- Gary (Argentine singer), Argentine singer of cuarteto songs

== Other uses ==
- Gary: Tank Commander, a British television sitcom
- Gary (mango), a mango cultivar
- 4735 Gary, an asteroid
- Gary Elks, an American football team from 1920 to 1923
- Gary (film), 2024 documentary film about Gary Coleman
- Gary (Blossoms song), a 2024 single by English band Blossoms
- Gary (album), a 2024 album by English band Blossoms
- Gary (Stephen Wilson Jr. song), a 2026 single by Stephen Wilson Jr.
- Gary (The Bear episode), a 2026 TV episode
- Gary (snail), fictional character Gary from the American animated TV show SpongeBob SquarePants

== See also ==
- Gadhi (disambiguation)
- Gadi (disambiguation)
- Garath (disambiguation)
- Gari (disambiguation)
- Garri (disambiguation)
- Garrie (disambiguation)
- Garrison (disambiguation)
- Garry (disambiguation)
- Gehry (surname)
- Geraldine (disambiguation)
- Gerhard (surname)
- Geri (disambiguation)
- Gerrie (disambiguation)
- Gerry (disambiguation)
- Gery (disambiguation)
- Ghadi (disambiguation)
- Ghari (disambiguation)
- Jari (disambiguation)
- Jarry (disambiguation)
- Jerri (disambiguation)
- Jerrie (given name)
- Jerry (disambiguation)
  - Jerry's (disambiguation)
- Garre, a Somali clan
- Gharry or gharri, a horse-drawn carriage in India
- Jarrie, a commune in France
