= Gareth (given name) =

- Pronunciation: UK: /ˈɡærəθ/ US: /ˈɡɛrəθ/ Welsh: [ˈɡarɛθ]
- Gender: Masculine
- Language: Welsh, English

Origin
- Region of origin: Britain

Gareth is a Welsh masculine given name. The name's popularity in Wales may be as a hypocorism of Geraint, which itself became popular after the famous hero and king of Dumnonia.

The modern name appears in Le Morte d'Arthur by Thomas Malory, in which it belongs to Sir Gareth, a brother of Sir Gawain and one of the Knights of the Round Table. Malory either based the name on Gahariet (a name found in French Arthurian texts) or on the Welsh word gwaredd, meaning 'gentleness'.

Notable people and characters named Gareth include:

== People ==
- Gareth Abraham (born 1969), Welsh footballer
- Gareth Bale (born 1989), Welsh footballer
- Gareth Barry (born 1981), English footballer
- Gareth Branwyn (born 1958), American writer and editor
- Gareth Brooks (born 1979), New Zealand field hockey player
- Gareth Chilcott (born 1956), English rugby union player
- Gareth Cooper (born 1979), Welsh rugby union player
- Gareth Coker (born 1984), British composer
- Gareth David (stage name Gareth Campesinos), lead singer of the English-Welsh indie pop band Los Campesinos!
- Gareth David-Lloyd (born 1981), Welsh actor
- Gareth Davies (disambiguation), several people
- Gareth Dean (born 1981), Welsh rugby league player
- Gareth Edwards (disambiguation), several people
- Gareth Ellis (born 1981), English rugby league player
- Gareth Emery (born 1980), British trance-genre producer and DJ
- Gareth Evans (disambiguation), several people
- Gareth Gates (born 1984), English singer-songwriter
- Gareth Glyn (born 1951), Welsh composer
- Gareth Griffiths (disambiguation), several people
- Gareth Hale (born 1953), English comedian and actor
- Gareth Hall (born 1969), English born Welsh international footballer
- Gareth Higgins, writer from Northern Ireland
- Gareth Hopkins (born 1976), New Zealand cricketer
- Gareth Hopkins (footballer) (born 1980), English footballer
- Gareth Hughes (1894–1965), Welsh actor
- Gareth Hughes (politician) (born 1981), New Zealand politician
- Gareth Hunt, stage name of English actor Alan Leonard Hunt (1942–2007)
- Gareth Hutch (died 2016), Irish murder victim
- Gareth Johnson (born 1969), British politician
- Gareth Johnson (hurler), Irish hurler
- Gareth Jones (disambiguation), several people
- Gareth Koch (born 1962), Australian classical guitarist
- Gareth Krause (born 1981), South African rugby union player
- Gareth Llewellyn (born 1969), Welsh rugby union player
- Gareth Malone (born 1975), British choirmaster and broadcaster
- Gareth Maule (born 1987), Welsh rugby union player
- Gareth McAuley (born 1979), Northern Irish footballer
- Gareth McGrillen (born 1981), Australian bass guitar player, record producer and DJ
- Gareth McLean (born c. 1975), Scottish journalist
- Gareth Mitchell (born 1970), Welsh journalist and lecturer
- Gareth Morgan (disambiguation), several people
- Gareth Naven (born 1969), Australian soccer manager and former player
- Gareth Owen (disambiguation), several people
- Gareth Peirce (born 1940), female English solicitor and human rights activist
- Gareth Philips, British television producer
- Gareth Pierce, Welsh actor
- Gareth Price (born 1980), Welsh rugby league player
- Gareth Price (rugby league) (1917–1992), Welsh rugby league player and coach
- Gareth Rees (disambiguation), several people
- Gareth Reynolds (born 1979), American-British comedian, producer, writer, and podcaster
- Gareth Roberts (disambiguation), several people
- Gareth Russell (author), British author
- Gareth Russell (musician), bass guitarist for Idlewild
- Gareth Southgate (born 1970), English football manager and former player
- Gareth Snell (born 1986), British Labour politician
- Gareth Steenson (born 1984), rugby union player from Northern Ireland
- Gareth Thomas (disambiguation), several people
- Gareth Unwin (born 1972), British film producer
- Gareth Ward, Australian politician
- Gareth Williams (disambiguation), several people
- Gareth Wood (born 1995), British acrobatic gymnast
- Gareth Wood (composer) (1950–2023), British composer

== Fictional characters ==
- Gareth Blackstock, title character of the British television sitcom Chef!
- Gareth Bryne, from the book series The Wheel of Time by author Robert Jordan and completed by Brandon Sanderson
- Gareth Griffiths, from the animated series Fireman Sam
- Gareth Keenan, a regular character from The Office
- Gareth Mallory, current M, James Bond's boss
- Gareth Lewis (Doctors), from the British soap opera Doctors
- Gareth Regan, from the British soap opera Doctors
- Gareth, a character in the animated series Adventure Time
- Gareth (The Walking Dead), from the American television show The Walking Dead
- Gareth, from Galavant
- Gareth, a character in Four Weddings and a Funeral, played by Simon Callow

== See also ==
- Garath (disambiguation)
- Garry (disambiguation)
- Gary (disambiguation)
- Garaidh
