= Gari, Russia =

Gari (Russian: Гари) is the name of several inhabited localities in Russia.

== Modern localities ==
=== Ivanovo Oblast ===
As of 2010, six rural localities in Ivanovo Oblast bear this name:

- Gari, Ilyinsky District, Ivanovo Oblast, a selo in Ilyinsky District
- Gari, Palekhsky District, Ivanovo Oblast, a village in Palekhsky District
- Gari, Puchezhsky District, Ivanovo Oblast, a village in Puchezhsky District
- Gari, Rodnikovsky District, Ivanovo Oblast, a village in Rodnikovsky District
- Gari, Shuysky District, Ivanovo Oblast, a village in Shuysky District
- Gari, Teykovsky District, Ivanovo Oblast, a village in Teykovsky District

=== Kirov Oblast ===
As of 2010, four rural localities in Kirov Oblast bear this name:

- Gari, Kirov, Kirov Oblast, a village under the administrative jurisdiction of Oktyabrsky City District of the City of Kirov
- Gari, Lebyazhsky District, Kirov Oblast, a village in Mikheyevsky Rural Okrug of Lebyazhsky District
- Gari, Malmyzhsky District, Kirov Oblast, a village in Tat-Verkh-Gonbinsky Rural Okrug of Malmyzhsky District
- Gari, Sunsky District, Kirov Oblast, a village in Bolshevistsky Rural Okrug of Sunsky District

=== Mari El Republic ===
As of 2010, one rural locality in the Mari El Republic bears this name:

- Gari, Mari El Republic, a village in Znamensky Rural Okrug of Medvedevsky District

=== Nizhny Novgorod Oblast ===
As of 2010, ten rural localities in Nizhny Novgorod Oblast bear this name:

- Gari, Semyonov, Nizhny Novgorod Oblast, a village in Ogibnovsky Selsoviet under the administrative jurisdiction of the town of oblast significance of Semyonov
- Gari, Ardatovsky District, Nizhny Novgorod Oblast, a selo in Chuvarley-Maydansky Selsoviet of Ardatovsky District
- Gari, Bogorodsky District, Nizhny Novgorod Oblast, a village in Kamensky Selsoviet of Bogorodsky District
- Gari, Chkalovsky District, Nizhny Novgorod Oblast, a village in Kotelnitsky Selsoviet of Chkalovsky District
- Gari, Koverninsky District, Nizhny Novgorod Oblast, a village in Gavrilovsky Selsoviet of Koverninsky District
- Gari, Lukoyanovsky District, Nizhny Novgorod Oblast, a selo in Tolsko-Maydansky Selsoviet of Lukoyanovsky District
- Gari, Perevozsky District, Nizhny Novgorod Oblast, a settlement in Paletsky Selsoviet of Perevozsky District
- Gari, Pilninsky District, Nizhny Novgorod Oblast, a village in Bolsheandosovsky Selsoviet of Pilninsky District
- Gari, Sokolsky District, Nizhny Novgorod Oblast, a selo in Loyminsky Selsoviet of Sokolsky District
- Gari, Vadsky District, Nizhny Novgorod Oblast, a selo in Dubensky Selsoviet of Vadsky District

=== Perm Krai ===
As of 2012, nine rural localities in Perm Krai bear this name:

- Gari, Dobryanka, Perm Krai, a village under the administrative jurisdiction of the town of krai significance of Dobryanka
- Gari, Bolshesosnovsky District, Perm Krai, a village in Bolshesosnovsky District
- Gari (Chastinskoye Rural Settlement), Chastinsky District, Perm Krai, a village in Chastinsky District; municipally, a part of Chastinskoye Rural Settlement of that district
- Gari (Babkinskoye Rural Settlement), Chastinsky District, Perm Krai, a village in Chastinsky District; municipally, a part of Babkinskoye Rural Settlement of that district
- Gari, Chernushinsky District, Perm Krai, a village in Chernushinsky District
- Gari, Ilyinsky District, Perm Krai, a village in Ilyinsky District
- Gari, Kishertsky District, Perm Krai, a village in Kishertsky District
- Gari, Kungursky District, Perm Krai, a village in Kungursky District
- Gari, Permsky District, Perm Krai, a village in Permsky District

=== Smolensk Oblast ===
As of 2010, one rural locality in Smolensk Oblast bears this name:

- Gari, Smolensk Oblast, a village in Klyarinovskoye Rural Settlement of Rudnyansky District

=== Sverdlovsk Oblast ===
As of 2010, one urban locality in Sverdlovsk Oblast bears this name:

- Gari, Sverdlovsk Oblast, a work settlement in Garinsky District

=== Republic of Tatarstan ===
As of 2010, one rural locality in the Republic of Tatarstan bears this name:

- Gari, Republic of Tatarstan, a selo in Yelabuzhsky District

=== Tver Oblast ===
As of 2010, two rural localities in Tver Oblast bear this name:

- Gari, Penovsky District, Tver Oblast, a village in Voroshilovskoye Rural Settlement of Penovsky District
- Gari, Torzhoksky District, Tver Oblast, a village in Nikolskoye Rural Settlement of Torzhoksky District

=== Udmurt Republic ===
As of 2010, one rural locality in the Udmurt Republic bears this name:

- Gari, Udmurt Republic, a vyselok in Uromsky Selsoviet of Malopurginsky District

=== Vologda Oblast ===
As of 2010, two rural localities in Vologda Oblast bear this name:

- Gari, Gryazovetsky District, Vologda Oblast, a village in Pertsevsky Selsoviet of Gryazovetsky District
- Gari, Sheksninsky District, Vologda Oblast, a village in Nifantovsky Selsoviet of Sheksninsky District

=== Yaroslavl Oblast ===
As of 2010, one rural locality in Yaroslavl Oblast bears this name:

- Gari, Yaroslavl Oblast, a village in Novoselsky Rural Okrug of Bolsheselsky District

== Abolished localities ==
- Gari, Cherdynsky District, Perm Krai, a village in Cherdynsky District; abolished in December 2011
