= Gari =

Gari may refer to:

== Places ==
- Gari, Tombouctou Region, Mali, a village
- Gari, Russia, several inhabited localities
- Gari, Kruševac, Serbia, a village
- Gari (river), Monte Cassino, Lazio, Italy
- Gari, an Indigenous name for Fraser Island in Queensland, Australia
- Gari, a crater on Mars

== People ==
- Gari (name), a list of people with the given name, nickname or surname

== Other uses ==
- Gari (ginger), a Japanese condiment
- Gari (bivalve), a bivalve mollusk genus
- Gari (vehicle), a cart
- Gari (band), a Japanese electro rock band formed in 1997
- Gari (sword), a traditional Indonesian sword
- Internationalist Revolutionary Action Groups (Groupes d'action révolutionnaire internationalistes), a Spanish anarchist militant group in 1970s France

== See also ==
- Gari-ye Bala ("Upper Gari"), Iran
- Gari-ye Pain ("Lower Gari"), Iran
- Garri, a West African flour-like food made from cassava
- Gaari (disambiguation)
- Ghari (disambiguation)
- Gharry
- Garre
- Garí
- Gary (disambiguation)
