= Gaddi =

Gaddi may refer to:

- Gaddis, a Hindu and Muslim pastoral community of India
  - Muslim Gaddi
  - Gaddi language or Bharmauri, a Western Pahari (Indo-Aryan) language spoken by the Gaddis in the Bharmour region of Himachal Pradesh, India
- Gaddi (name), a list of people with the name
- Gaddi (sheep), a breed of sheep from India
- Gaddi (biblical figure), one of the scouts sent by Moses into the Land of Canaan

== See also ==
- Gadi (disambiguation)
- Gaddis (surname)
- Gaddi Torso, a Hellenistic sculpture of the 2nd century BCE
