= Gary Williams (disambiguation) =

Gary Williams (born 1945) is an American basketball player and coach.

Gary or Garry Williams may also refer to:

== Arts and entertainment ==
- Gary Anthony Williams (born 1966), American actor
- Gary Williams (singer) (born 1970), English singer
- Gary Williams (fl. 1990s), British musician, member of Ultravox

== Sports ==
=== American football ===
- Gary W. C. Williams (born 1936), Canadian football player in the CFL
- Gary Williams (American football) (born 1959), American NFL football player
- Garry Williams (gridiron football) (born 1986), American football player in the NFL and CFL

=== Association football (soccer) ===
- Gary Williams (footballer, born 1954), English footballer for Preston, Brighton and Crystal Palace
- Gary Williams (footballer, born 1959), English footballer for Blackpool, Swindon and Tranmere
- Gary Williams (footballer, born 1960), English footballer for Aston Villa
- Gary Williams (footballer, born 1963), English footballer for Bristol City and Oldham
- Gary Williams (football manager) (born 1977), English football manager

=== Other sports ===
- Gary Hart (wrestler) (Gary Richard Williams, 1942–2008), American wrestler
- Gary Williams (Australian footballer) (born 1950), Australian rules footballer
- Gary Williams (New Zealand cricketer) (1953–2025), New Zealand cricketer
- Garry Williams (Australian footballer) (born 1956), Australian rules footballer
- Gary Williams (English cricketer) (born 1965), English cricketer
- Gary Williams (wrestler) (born 1972), Canadian wrestler
- Gary Williams, host of the Golf Channel's Morning Drive

== Others ==
- Gary Williams, Australian linguist and CEO of Muurrbay Aboriginal Language and Culture Co-operative
- Gary Williams (politician), American politician, member of the Pennsylvania House of Representatives
- Garry Williams (theologian), English theologian and academic

== See also ==
- Gareth Williams (disambiguation)
