= Garrie =

Garrie may refer to:

- Garrie (given name), a masculine given name
- Garrie (surname), a British surname

== See also ==
- Garie (disambiguation)
- Garri (disambiguation)
- Garry (disambiguation)
- Gerrie (disambiguation)
- Gharry
- Jarrie
