= Garrey (name) =

Garrey is a both a surname and given name. Notable people with the name Garrey include:

People with the surname:

- George H. Garrey (1875–1957), American mining geologist
- Walter E. Garrey (1874–1951), American physiologist

People with the given name:

- Garrey Carruthers (born 1939), American politician and academic
- Garrey Dawson, British chef
- Garrey Wynd (born 1946), former Australian rules footballer

== See also ==
- Garry (disambiguation)
- Gerry (disambiguation)
- Gary (disambiguation)
