= Garie =

Garie may refer to:

- Garie Beach, a surfing location in New South Wales, Australia
- Garie or Gary, a South Korean entertainer

== See also ==
- Gari (disambiguation)
- Garrie (disambiguation)
- Gary (disambiguation)
