= Faddis =

Faddis is a surname. Notable people with the surname include:

- Charles I. Faddis (1890–1972), American politician
- Jon Faddis (born 1953), American jazz trumpet player, conductor, composer, and educator

== See also ==
- Addis (name)
- Gaddis (surname)
