= Gareth Morgan =

Gary or Gareth Morgan may refer to:

== Sportsmen ==
- Gary Morgan (racewalker) (born 1960), American Olympic racewalker
- Gary Morgan (footballer) (born 1961), English left back
- Gareth Morgan (baseball) (born 1996), Canadian outfielder

== Writers ==
- Gareth Morgan (business theorist) (born 1943), Welsh-Canadian author of management theory
- Gareth Morgan (economist) (born 1953), New Zealand politician, economist, businessman and philanthropist
- Gareth Morgan (editor), English editor in 2003 of tabloid Daily Star Sunday

== Others ==
- Gary Morgan, Canadian politician in 1996 Progressive Conservative Party of Prince Edward Island leadership elections#1996 leadership convention
- Gary Morgan (actor) (born 1950), American performer and stuntman
- Gareth Morgan (South African politician) (born 1977), South African MP
- Gareth Morgan (painter) (born 1978), British artist
