= Gareth Williams =

Gareth Williams may refer to:

== Arts and entertainment ==
- Gareth Williams (British musician) (1953–2001), member of English group This Heat
- Gareth F. Williams (1955–2016), Welsh novelist and television writer
- Gareth Williams (composer) (born 1977), Irish composer
- Gareth Williams (New Zealand actor) (born 1987), New Zealand television, film and theater actor
- Gareth Williams (American actor) (born 1965), American actor

== Sports ==
=== Association football (soccer) ===
- Gareth Williams (footballer, born 1941) (1941–2018), English-born Welsh footballer
- Gareth Williams (footballer, born 1967), English footballer
- Gareth Williams (footballer, born 1981), Scottish footballer
- Gareth Williams (footballer, born 1982), South African-born Welsh footballer

=== Rugby ===
- Gareth Williams (rugby union, born 1954) (1954–2018), Wales and British Lions international rugby union player
- Gareth Williams (rugby union, born 1978), Wales international rugby union hooker
- Gareth Williams (rugby union, born 1981), Welsh rugby union flanker
- Gareth Williams (rugby union, born 1988), Welsh rugby union scrum-half

=== Other sports ===
- Gareth Williams (cricketer) (born 1973), English cricketer
- Gareth Williams (tennis), South African tennis player

== Others ==
- Gareth Williams, Baron Williams of Mostyn (1941–2003), Welsh barrister and Labour politician
- Gareth V. Williams (born 1965), English-American astronomer at the Minor Planet Center
- Gareth Wyn Williams (1978–2010), Welsh mathematician, employee of Britain's GCHQ signals intelligence agency, found dead in 2010
- Gareth Williams (Latin Americanist) (fl. 1990s), Latin Americanist, member of Latin American subaltern studies group

== See also ==
- Garth Williams (1912–1996), American children’s illustrator
- Gary Williams (disambiguation)
