= Jerri =

Jerri may refer to:

- Jerri (given name), a given name
- Abdul Jerri (born 1932), Iraqi-American physicist
- Jèrri, the name of island Jersey in the local language Jèrriais
- Jerri (footballer) (born 1982), Jerri Ariel Farias Hahn, Brazilian footballer

== See also ==
- Jarri
- Jerrie
- Gerri (disambiguation)
- Jerry (disambiguation)
