= Gadhi (disambiguation) =

Gadhi is a village development committee in the Narayani Zone of southeastern Nepal.

Gadhi may also refer to:

- Gadhi (structure), a type of small castle-like structure or fort in India
- Gadhi (tribe), a Baloch tribe in Pakistan
- Gadhi, Sunsari, a rural Municipality in Sunsari, Nepal

== See also ==
- Ghadi (disambiguation)
- Gadi (disambiguation)
