= Garri (disambiguation) =

Garri is a popular West African food made from cassava tubers.

Garri may also refer to:

- Garri (given name), a masculine given name
- Garri, Iran, a village in Iran
- Luca Garri (born 1982), Italian basketball player

== See also ==
- Gari (disambiguation)
- Gerri (disambiguation)
- Garry (disambiguation)
- Jarri
