= Gareth Jones =

Gareth Jones may refer to:

== Academics ==
- Gareth Jones (legal scholar) (1930–2016), British law professor, "founding father" of the English law of restitution
- W. Gareth Jones (born 1936), Welsh academic and translator
- Gareth Jones (anatomist) (born 1940), New Zealand professor of neuroscience, bioethics and anatomy
- Gareth Stedman Jones (born 1942), British historian
- Gareth Jones (computer scientist), British professor of information technology
- Gareth Jones (geographer), British professor of urban geography

== Arts and entertainment ==
- Gareth Jones (actor) (1925–1958), British actor
- Gareth Jones (director) (born 1951), British film and television director and screenwriter
- Gareth Jones (music producer) (born 1954), English music producer and engineer
- Gareth Jones (conductor) (born 1960), Welsh conductor of the Welsh National Opera chorus
- Gareth Jones (presenter) (born 1961), Welsh television presenter
- Gareth P. Jones (fl. 2006–present), British children's author
- Gareth Jones (EastEnders), fictional television character better known as Andy Flynn
- Gareth Jones (fl. 1998–2013), Welsh singer and guitarist of the band People in Planes

== Others ==
- Gareth Jones (journalist) (1905–1935), Welsh journalist
- Gareth Jones (politician) (born 1939), Welsh politician, member of the National Assembly for Wales
- Gareth Bryan-Jones (born 1943), British Olympic middle-distance runner
- Gareth Jones (rugby union, born 1975) (born 1975), Welsh rugby union three-quarter
- Gareth Jones (rugby union, born 1979) (1979–2008), Welsh rugby union scrum-half

== Other uses ==
- Gareth Jones (film)

== See also ==
- Gary Jones (disambiguation)
