= Brighton Festival =

Annual multi-arts festival in England

- Locations: Brighton and Hove, England
- Years active: 1967–present
- Website: www.brightonfestival.org

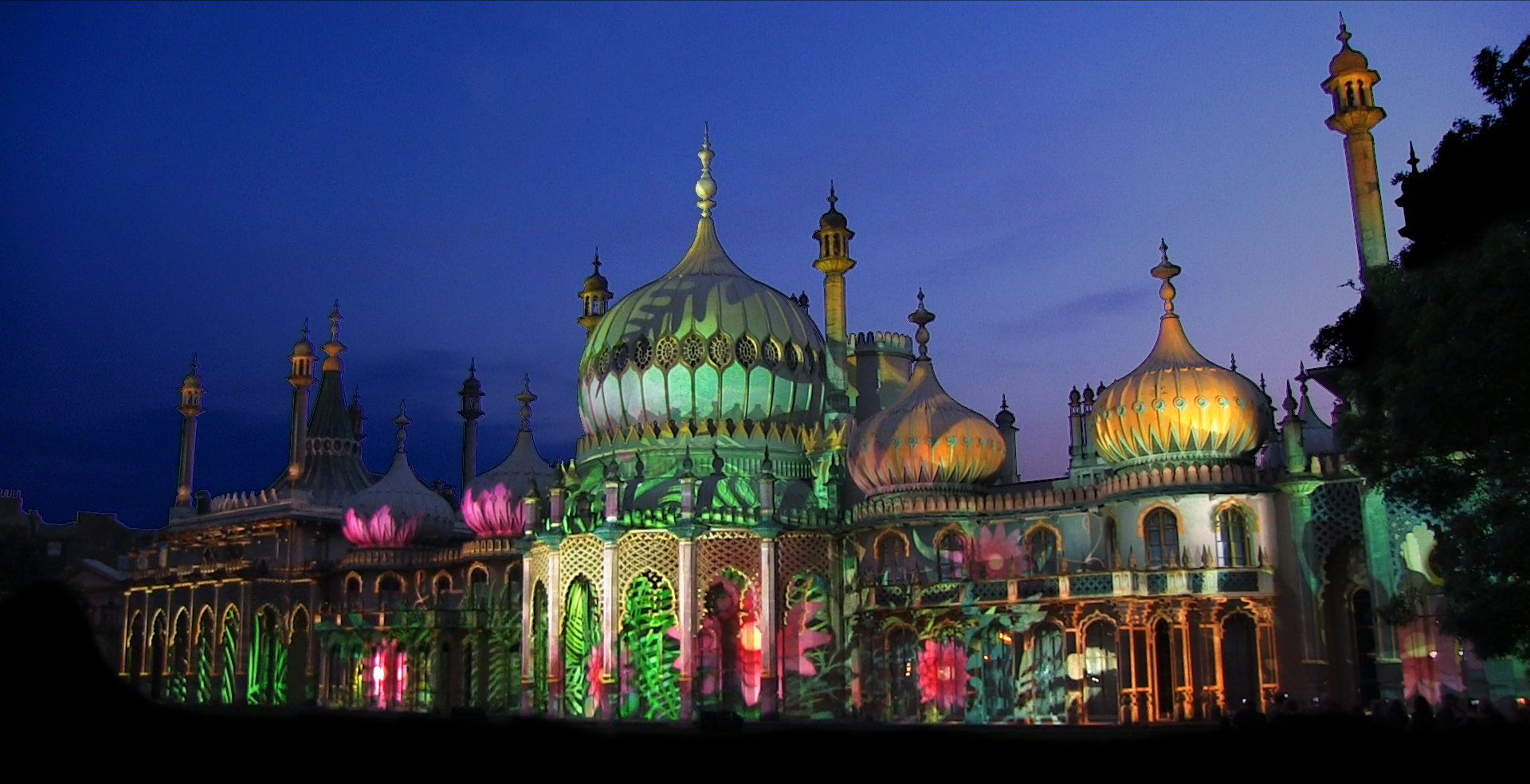
The Brighton Pavilion illuminated as part of the 2016 festival

Brighton Festival is an annual multi-arts festival in Brighton and Hove in East Sussex, England, first held in 1967. It includes music, theatre, dance, circus, art, film, literature, debate, outdoor and family events.

== History ==
In 1964, the first moves were made to hold a festival in Brighton, and Ian Hunter, the eventual artistic director of the Festival, submitted a programme of ideas. This was followed by a weekend conference in 1965, and the board of the Brighton Festival Society was born. The inaugural festival was held in 1967, and included the first ever exhibition of concrete poetry in the UK, alongside performances by Laurence Olivier and Yehudi Menuhin.

In the introduction to the 1968 Festival programme, Ian Hunter explained the original intentions of the festival: “The aim of the Brighton Festival is to stimulate townsfolk and visitors into taking a new look at the arts and to give them the opportunity to assess developments in the field of culture where the serious and the apparently flippant ride side by side.”

In 2016, the Brighton Festival celebrated its 50th anniversary. One of the festival's featured events was Nutkhut's Dr Blighty, an outdoor immersive installation co-commissioned in partnership with Royal Pavilion & Museums and 14–18 NOW. The event explored the story of wounded Indian soldiers hospitalised in Brighton during the First World War.

The festival regularly commissions new work from some artists and companies. The 2016 Brighton Festival featured 54 commissions, co-commissions, exclusives and premieres, including the UK premiere of Laurie Anderson's unique Music for Dogs, a concert specially designed for the canine ear; the UK premiere of Lou Reed Drones, an installation of Anderson's late husband's guitars and amps in feedback mode, which she described as "kind of as close to Lou's music as we can get these days", a re-enactment of every onstage death from the plays of William Shakespeare from Brighton-based Spymonkey and Tim Crouch; and Blast Theory & Hydrocracker's immersive undercover police drama Operation Black Antler.

In 2020, the festival was cancelled for the first time as a result of the coronavirus pandemic.

== Guest directors ==
Each year since 2009, the festival has appointed a guest artistic director.

- 2009: Anish Kapoor
- 2010: Brian Eno
- 2011: Aung San Suu Kyi
- 2012: Vanessa Redgrave
- 2013: Michael Rosen
- 2014: Hofesh Shechter
- 2015: Ali Smith
- 2016: Laurie Anderson
- 2017: Kae Tempest
- 2018: David Shrigley
- 2019: Rokia Traoré
- 2020: Cancelled due to the COVID-19 pandemic; Lemn Sissay was to direct
- 2021: Lemn Sissay
- 2022: Marwa Al-Sabouni and Tristan Sharps
- 2023: Nabihah Iqbal
- 2024: Frank Cottrell-Boyce

== See also ==
- Brighton Fringe (England's largest arts festival)
- Edinburgh Fringe (the UK's largest arts festival)
- Norfolk and Norwich Festival the UK's oldest arts festival)
