= Ghara (disambiguation) =

Ghara is an earthen pot made in India and Pakistan.

Ghara may also refer to:

- Ghara, Nepal, a village in the Myagdi district, Annapurna R.M of Nepal
- Ghara Balooch, an administrative unit of Tank District, Khyber Pakhtunkhwa province, Pakistan
- Bunan language also Ghara, a Tibetic (Sino-Tibetan) language of Himachal Pradesh, India

== See also ==
- Ghari (disambiguation)
- Ghadi (disambiguation)
- Ghat (disambiguation)
- Ghar (disambiguation)
- Qara (disambiguation)
- Lahuli language (disambiguation), another name of the language
