= Garath =

Garath is the given name of:

- Garath Archer (born 1974), former English rugby union footballer
- Garath McCleary (born 1987), English professional footballer
- Belgarath the Sorcerer (fictional), a major character in The Belgariad by David Eddings, originally named Garath, his name is altered later on in his youth.

== See also ==
- Düsseldorf-Garath, a quarter in Düsseldorf Germany
- Gareth (given name)
- Garry (disambiguation)
- Gary (disambiguation)
- Garaidh
