= The Cherry Orchard =

1904 play by Anton Chekhov

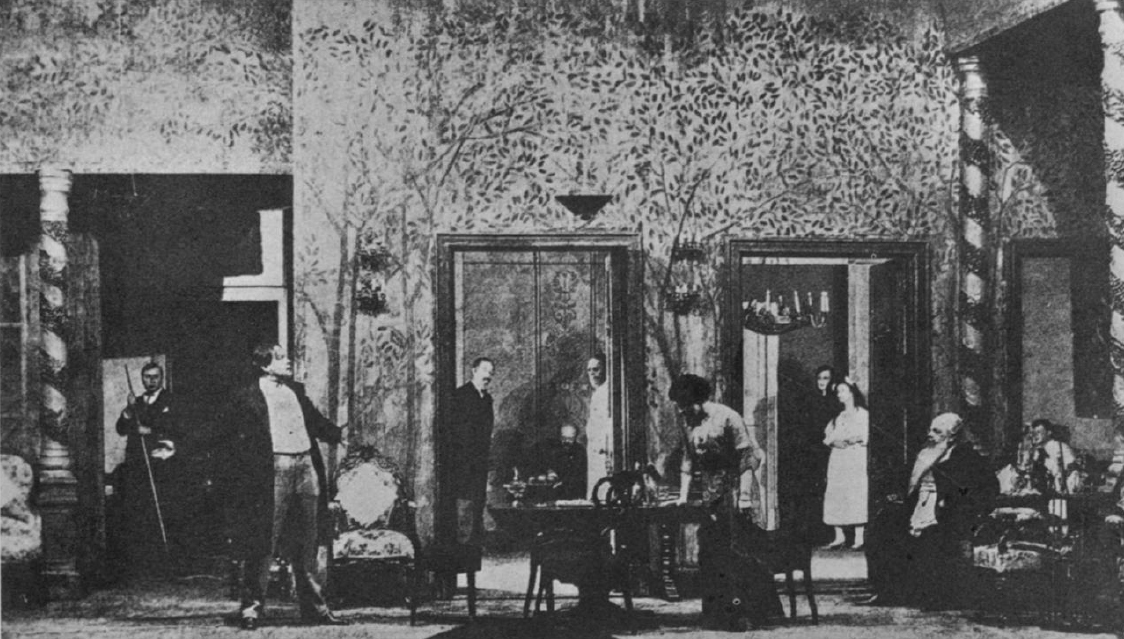
- Scene from Act 3 of the original production at the Moscow Art Theatre
- Original language: Russian
- Written by: Anton Chekhov
- Genre: Drama, tragicomedy

Premiere
- Date: 1904
- Place: Moscow Art Theatre

The Cherry Orchard (Russian: Вишнёвый сад, romanized: Vishnyovyi sad) is the last play by the Russian playwright Anton Chekhov. Written in 1903, it was first published by Znaniye (Book Two, 1904), and it appeared as a separate edition later that year in Saint Petersburg via A.F. Marks Publishers. On 17 January 1904, it opened at the Moscow Art Theatre in a production directed by Konstantin Stanislavski. Chekhov described the play as a comedy, with some elements of farce, though Stanislavski treated it as a tragedy. Since its first production, directors have struggled with its dual nature. It is often identified as one of the four outstanding plays by Chekhov, along with The Seagull, Three Sisters, and Uncle Vanya.

The play revolves around an aristocratic Russian landowner who returns to her family estate, which includes a large and well-known cherry orchard; she returns just before the estate is auctioned to pay the mortgage. Unresponsive to offers to save the estate, she allows its sale to the son of a former serf, and the family departs to the sound of the cherry orchard being cut down. The story presents themes of cultural futility – the attempts of the aristocracy to maintain its status, and the attempts of the bourgeoisie to find meaning in its newfound materialism. The play dramatizes the socioeconomic forces in Russia at the turn of the 20th century; these forces include the rise of the middle class after the abolition of serfdom in the mid-19th century, in addition to the decline in power of the aristocracy.

Widely regarded as a classic of 20th-century theatre, the play has been translated into many languages and produced around the world. Major theatre directors have staged it, including Charles Laughton, Peter Brook, Andrei Șerban, Jean-Louis Barrault, Tyrone Guthrie, Katie Mitchell, Robert Falls, and Giorgio Strehler. The play has influenced many other playwrights, including Eugene O'Neill, George Bernard Shaw, David Mamet, and Arthur Miller.

== Characters ==
The Cherry Orchard involves a number of characters. In languages other than Russian, the spelling of their names depends on the transliteration used.

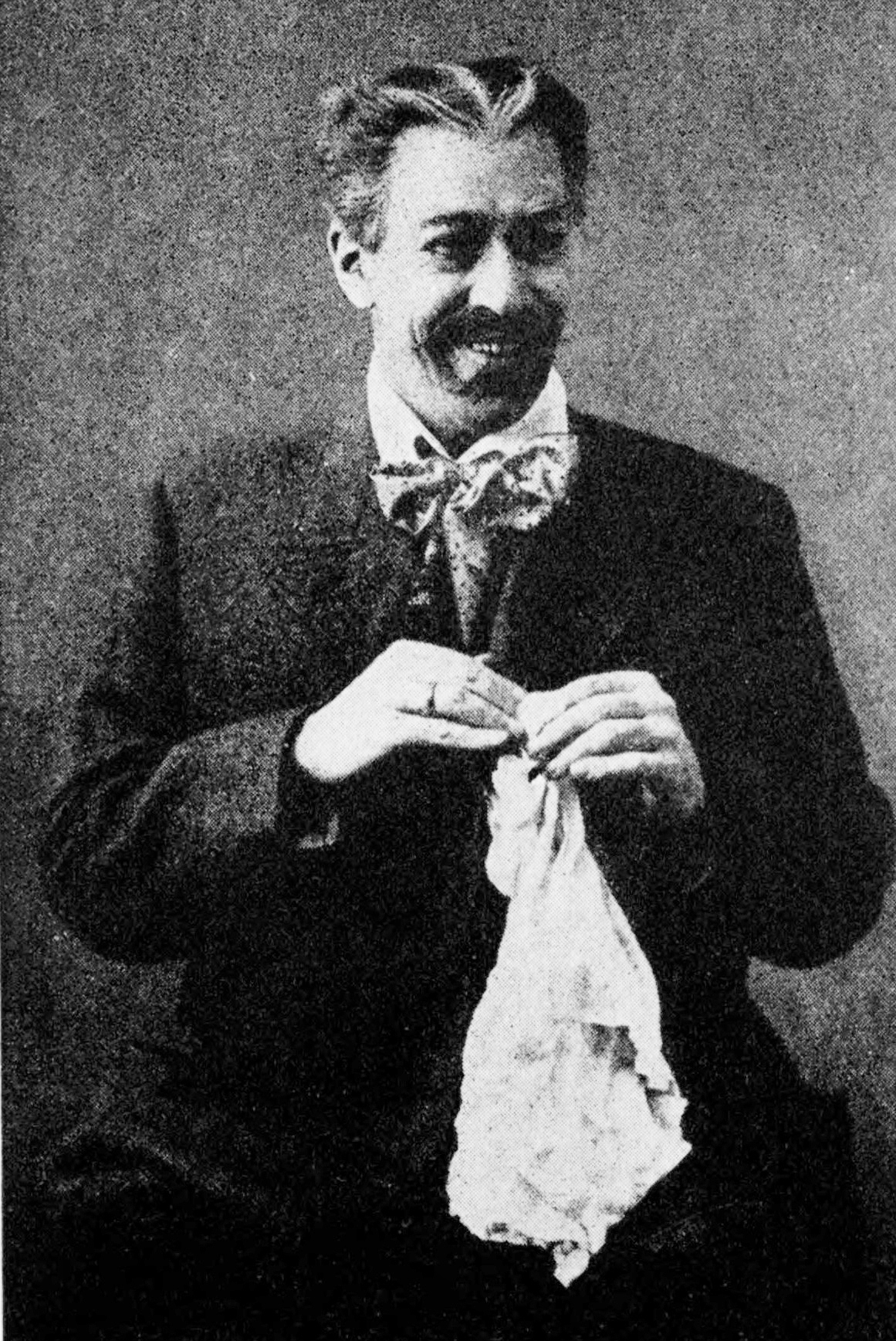
Actor and director Konstantin Stanislavski as Leonid Gayev, c. 1922

=== Family ===
==== Madame Lyubov Andreievna Ranevskaya ====
A landowner. Ranyevskaya is the linchpin around which the other characters revolve. A commanding and popular figure, she represents the pride of the old aristocracy, now fallen on hard times. She has confused feelings of love for her old home and sorrow at the scene of her son's death; these give her an emotional depth that keeps her from devolving into a mere aristocratic grotesque. Most of her humor comes from an inability to understand financial or business matters.

==== Anya ====
Lyubov's daughter, aged seventeen. She journeys to Paris to rescue her mother from a desperate situation. She is virtuous and strong. She is close to Trofimov and listens to his revolutionary ideas, although she may not be absorbing them.

==== Varya ====
Lyubov's adopted daughter, aged twenty-four. Varya manages the estate and keeps everything in order. She is the glue that holds the family together. The reason that Ranevskaya adopted her remains unclear, though she is said to have come from "simple people" (most likely serfs). Varya fantasizes about becoming a nun, though she lacks the financial means to do so. She adores her mother and sister, and she frets constantly about money. Her relationship with Lopakhin is mysterious; all characters in the play assume that these two are about to be married, but neither of them acts on it.

==== Leonid Andreieveitch Gayev ("Lyonya") ====
The brother of Madame Ranevskaya. One of the more obvious comic characters, Gayev is a talkative eccentric. His addiction to billiards (often appearing at times of discomfort) is symbolic of the aristocracy's decadent life of leisure, which renders them impotent in the face of change. Gayev tries hard to save his family and estate; ultimately, as an aristocrat, he either lacks sufficient drive or doesn't understand the real-world mechanisms needed to realize his goals.

==== Grisha ====
The son of Lyubov, drowned many years ago before her sojourn in Paris. She is reminded of his existence by the presence of Trofimov, who was his tutor.

=== Friends and associates ===
==== Peter Trofimov ("Petya") ====
A student and Anya's friend. Trofimov is depicted as an "eternal" student (in some translations, a "wandering" student). An impassioned left-wing political commentator, he represents the rising tide of reformist political opinion in Russia, which struggled to find its place in the authoritarian Czarist autocracy.

==== Boris Borisovich Simeonov-Pishchik ====
A landowner and another old aristocrat whose estate has hit hard times. He is constantly discussing new business ventures that may save him, as well as badgering Ranyevskaya for a loan. His character embodies the irony of the aristocracy's position: despite his financial peril, he spends the play relaxing and socializing with the Gayevs.

==== Yermolai Alexeievitch Lopakhin ====
A merchant. Lopakhin is by far the wealthiest character in the play, but he comes from the lowest social class, since his father was a peasant and his grandfather was a serf. This contrast defines his character: he enjoys living the high life, but at the same time, he is uncomfortably conscious of his low beginnings and obsession with business. He is often portrayed on stage as an unpleasant character because of his greedy tendencies and ultimate betrayal of the Gayev family, but nothing in the play itself suggests this; he works strenuously to help the Gayevs, but to no avail. Lopakhin represents the new middle class in Russia, one of many threats to the old aristocratic way of life.

==== Charlotta Ivanovna ====
A governess. By far the most eccentric character, Charlotta is the only governess whom the Gayevs can afford, and she is a companion for Anya. She is a melancholy figure, raised by a German woman with no real knowledge of who her circus entertainer parents were. She performs card tricks and ventriloquism at the party in the play's third act, and she pragmatically accepts her loss of station when the family disbands.

=== Servants and dependents ===
==== Yepikhodov ====
A clerk. The Gayev's estate clerk is another source of comedy. He is unfortunate and clumsy in the extreme, earning him the insulting nickname "Twenty-Two Calamities", mostly invoked by Yasha. (The nickname varies among translations.) Yepikhodov considers himself to be in love with Dunyasha, whom he has asked to marry him.

==== Dunyasha ====
A housemaid. Like Lopakhin, she is another example of social mobility in Russia during this period. A peasant who is employed as the Gayev's chambermaid, Dunyasha is an attention seeker, making dramatic scenes and dressing as a lady to show off. She is in some respects representative of the aristocracy's impotence, since a chambermaid would not previously have had the freedom to dress like a lady and flirt with menservants. Although pursued romantically by Yepikhodov, she is in love with Yasha, attracted to the cultivation that he has acquired in Paris.

==== Firs ====
A manservant, aged 87. An aging eccentric, Firs considers the emancipation of the Russian serfs to be a disaster, and he speaks nostalgically of the old days when all serfs admired their masters and owners, such as Gayev's parents and grandparents. His senility is a source of much of the play's poignancy, symbolizing the decay of the old order into muttering madness.

==== Yasha ====
A young manservant, accompanying Lyubov on her way back from Paris and desperate to return. Yasha represents the new, disaffected Russian generation, who dislike the staid old ways and who will be the foot soldiers of the revolution. A rude, inconsiderate, and predatory young man, Yasha, like Dunyasha and Charlotta, is the best the Gayevs can afford. He toys with the girlish affections of Dunyasha, the maid.

=== Minor characters ===
==== A Stranger ====
A passer-by who encounters the Gayevs as they idle about on their estate during Act II. He is symbolic of the intrusion of new ideologies and social movements that infringed on the aristocracy's peace in Russia at the turn of the 20th century.

==== The Stationmaster and the Postmaster ====
Both officials attend the Gayevs' party in Act III. They play minor roles: the Stationmaster attempts to recite a poem, and the Postmaster flirts with Dunyasha. Nevertheless, they are primarily symbols of the decline of the aristocracy in 1900s Russia. Firs comments that although they once had barons and lords at the ball, now it is the postman and the stationmaster who attend, even if only to be polite.

==== Guests and miscellaneous figures ====
In addition to the characters named above, the minor characters include guests and miscellaneous figures.

== Plot ==
=== Act 1 ===
The play opens on a May day in the nursery of Lyubov Andreyevna Ranevskaya's home in the provinces of Russia, at the start of the 20th century. Ranevskaya has been living in France since her young son drowned. After she tried to kill herself, Ranevskaya's 17-year-old daughter Anya and Anya's governess Charlotta Ivanovna have brought her home, accompanied by Yasha, Ranevskaya's valet. Upon returning, they are met by Lopakhin, Dunyasha, Varya (who has overseen the estate in Ranevskaya's absence), Ranevskaya's brother Gayev, Boris Simeonov-Pishchik, Semyon Yepikhodov, and Firs.

Lopakhin has come to remind Ranevskaya and Gayev that their estate, including the cherry orchard, will soon be auctioned to pay off the family's debts. Lopakhin proposes to save the estate by allowing part of it to be developed into summer cottages; however, this would require the destruction of the cherry orchard, which is nationally known for its size.

Ranevskaya is enjoying the view of the orchard as day breaks, when she is surprised by Peter Trofimov, a young student and former tutor of Ranevskaya's dead son, Grisha. Trofimov had insisted on seeing Ranevskaya upon her return, and she is grief-stricken at the reminder of this tragedy. After Ranevskaya retires for the evening, Anya confesses to Varya that their mother is heavily in debt. They retire for the night with the hope that the estate will be saved and the cherry orchard preserved. Trofimov gazes after the departing Anya in adoration.

=== Act 2 ===
Act II takes place outdoors near the orchard. Yepikhodov and Yasha vie for Dunyasha's affection by singing and playing guitar, while Charlotta soliloquizes about her life. In Act I, it was revealed that Yepikhodov had proposed to Dunyasha at Easter; however, she has become infatuated with the more "cultured" Yasha. Charlotta departs so that Dunyasha and Yasha might have some time alone, but this is interrupted when they hear their employer coming. Yasha shoos Dunyasha away to avoid being caught; Ranevskaya, Gayev, and Lopakhin appear, once more discussing the uncertain fate of the cherry orchard. Soon Anya, Varya, and Trofimov arrive as well. Lopakhin teases Trofimov for being a perpetual student, and Trofimov espouses his philosophy of work and useful purpose, to the delight and humour of everyone around. During their conversations, a dishevelled beggar passes by; Ranevskaya gives him a gold coin (ten rubles), despite the protestations of Varya. Shaken by the disturbance, the family departs for dinner. Anya stays behind to talk with Trofimov, who disapproves of Varya, reassuring Anya that they are "above love". To impress Trofimov, Anya vows to leave the past behind and start a new life. The two depart for the river, as Varya calls in the background.

=== Act 3 ===
At the end of August, Ranevskaya's party is held. Musicians play while the family and guests drink and entertain themselves. It is also the day of the auction. Gayev has received a meager sum of money from his and Ranevskaya's aunt; the family members, despite the general merriment around them, are anxious while they await news. Varya worries about paying the musicians and scolds their neighbor Pishchik for drinking, Dunyasha for dancing, and Yepikhodov for playing billiards. Charlotta performs magic tricks. Ranevskaya scolds Trofimov for his teasing of Varya, whom he refers to as "Madame Lopakhin". She then urges Varya to marry Lopakhin, but Varya demurs, reminding her that it is Lopakhin's duty to ask for her hand in marriage, not the other way around. She says that if she had money, she would move as far away as possible. Alone with Ranevskaya, Trofimov insists that she finally face the fact that the house and orchard will be sold at auction. Ranevskaya shows him a telegram she has received, and she reveals that her former lover is ill and has begged her to return to Paris. She is seriously considering this, despite his cruel behaviour toward her in the past. Trofimov is stunned at this revelation; they argue about the nature of love and their respective experiences. Trofimov leaves, but he falls down the stairs offstage and is carried in by the other people. Ranevskaya laughs and forgives him for his folly, and the two reconcile. Anya enters with a rumour that the estate has been sold. Lopakhin arrives with Gayev, both of them exhausted from the trip and the day's events. Gayev is distant, and he goes to bed without saying a word about the outcome of the auction. When Ranevskaya asks who bought the estate, Lopakhin reveals that he is the purchaser, and he intends to chop down the orchard. Ranevskaya, distraught, clings to Anya, who reassures her that the future has improved.

=== Act 4 ===
Several weeks later, the family's belongings are being packed as the family prepares to leave the estate. Trofimov enters, and he and Lopakhin exchange conflicting world views. Lopakhin does not propose to Varya. Anya enters, and she reprimands Lopakhin for ordering his workers to begin chopping down the cherry orchard while the family is still there; Lopakhin apologises and rushes out to stop them for the time being, in hopes that he will somehow be reconciled with the family. Charlotta enters, lost and in a daze, and she insists that the family find her a new position. Ranevskaya bids her old life farewell and leaves as the house is shut up permanently. In the gloom, Firs wanders into the room; he discovers that the others have left without him and boarded him inside the abandoned house to die. He lies down and resigns himself to this fate. The sound of axes cutting down trees is heard offstage.

== Themes ==
A major theme of the play is the impact of social change. On 19 February 1861, Russian Emperor Alexander II emancipated the serfs; this allowed former serfs to gain wealth and status, while some aristocrats became impoverished, unable to tend their estates without the inexpensive labor of serfdom. The effect of these reforms was still being felt when Chekhov was writing forty years later.

Chekhov originally intended the play as a comedy. (The title page of the work refers to it as such.) In letters, he noted that it is almost farcical in certain places. When he saw the original Moscow Art Theatre production directed by Konstantin Stanislavski, Chekov was horrified to find that the director had shaped the play into a tragedy. Since that time, directors have struggled with the dual nature of this play (and of Chekhov's works in general).

Ranevskaya fails to address the problems facing her estate and family; this means that she eventually loses almost everything, and her fate can be seen as a criticism of those people who are unwilling to adapt to the new Russia. Her petulant refusal to accept the truth of her past, in both life and love, is her downfall throughout the play. She ultimately runs between her lives in Paris and Russia – she arrives from Paris at the start of the play, and she returns there afterwards. She lives in an illusion of the past, often reliving memories about her son's death (and so on). The student Trofimov's speeches attacked intellectuals; these speeches were later seen as early manifestations of Bolshevik ideas, and his lines were often censored by Tsarist officials. Cherry trees themselves are often seen as symbols of sadness or regret about the passing of a certain situation or of the times in general.

The idea of independence (or freedom) is relevant to the positions of Firs and Lopakhin. Firs has been with the estate for decades, and he has only experienced service to his masters. When the news arrives about the orchard being sold, Firs seems unfazed and continues to carry out his duties, but he is unable to find his independence; Lopakhin is able to "free" himself, in the sense that he finds motivation to continue. Even though the two characters are opposites on the social ladder, they both face internal struggles about their future lives after the orchard is chopped down.

== Production history ==
=== Initial 1904 production ===
"Anya, I fear, should not have any sort of tearful tone ... Not once does my Anya cry, and nowhere do I speak of a tearful tone; in the second act, there are tears in their eyes, but the tone is happy and lively. Why did you speak in your telegram about so many tears in my play? Where are they? ... Often you will find the words "through tears," but I am describing only the expression on their faces, not tears. And in the second act there is no graveyard."

— Chekov, in a letter expressing his disdain for Stanislavski's production

The Cherry Orchard opened at the Moscow Art Theatre on 17 January 1904, the birthday of actor-director Konstantin Stanislavski. During the rehearsal period, Stanislavski – famously contrary to Chekhov's wishes – restructured Act 2 into a tragedy. Chekhov intensely disliked the Stanislavski production, openly declaring that Stanislavski had "ruined" his play. Chekhov's wife Olga Knipper played Madame Ranevskaya in the original production, as well as the 300th production by the theatre in 1943.

Despite opening to mixed critical response, the debut was a resounding theatrical success. Productions opened almost immediately in many of Russia's important provincial cities, and the play soon received great acclaim abroad. Shortly after the play's debut, Chekhov departed for Germany because of worsening health, where he died by July 1904.

During pre-revolutionary performances at Sofia Panina's People's House in Saint Petersburg, the modest and newly urbanized audiences reportedly cheered as the eponymous orchard was felled on stage.

=== 20th century ===
==== 1900–1949 ====
- 1911: The first performance in English was given on 28 May 1911 by the Stage Society at the Aldwych Theatre, London, in a translation by Constance Garnett. The director was Kenelm Foss, and the cast included Edmund Breon (Yasha), Herbert Bunston (Lopakhin), Franklin Dyall (Gaev), Mary Jerrold (Varya), Nigel Playfair (Simeonov-Pishchik), and Harcourt Williams (Trofimov).
- 1922–1924: The Moscow Art company took the play to Paris in 1922 and to Broadway in 1923–24. The author's widow, Olga Knipper-Tchekhova, played Ranevskaya; Stanislavski played Gaev.
- 1925: A production by J. B. Fagan, first seen at the Oxford Playhouse, was transferred to the Lyric Theatre, Hammersmith. It was then transferred to the Royalty Theatre, London, where it ran for more than 120 performances. Among the cast were the young John Gielgud as Trofimov; Glen Byam Shaw as Yasha; and O. B. Clarence and later Richard Goolden as Firs.
- 1928: Fagan took his production to Broadway in 1928 – the first production in English in the US. It opened at the Bijou Theatre in March for a limited season of matinees.
- 1933: Tyrone Guthrie's production at the Old Vic in October 1933, using Hubert Butler's new, colloquial translation, emphasized the comic aspects of the play. The cast was headed by Athene Seyler as Ranevskaya, with Ursula Jeans (Anya), Charles Laughton (Lopakhin), Roger Livesey (Simeonov-Pishchik), Leon Quartermaine (Gaev), and Flora Robson (Varya).

==== 1950–1999 ====
- 1961: The first production of The Cherry Orchard by the Royal Shakespeare Company (RSC) was in December 1961 at the Royal Shakespeare Theatre, later being transferred to the Aldwych. Michel Saint-Denis directed Gielgud's translation of the play, with a cast including Peggy Ashcroft (Ranevskaya), Gielgud (Gaev), Dorothy Tutin (Varya), Judi Dench (Anya), Paul Hardwick (Simeonov-Pishchik), Ian Holm (Trofimov), Patrick Wymark (Yepikhodov), and Roy Dotrice (Firs).
- 1965, 1987, and 1998: The Stratford Festival of Canada mounted productions in 1965, 1987, and 1998. The 1965 production was the first time that a Chekhov play had been performed there. Furthermore, The Cherry Orchard marked the Stratford directorial debut of John Hirsch. Three of the original Stratford company members were in the cast: William Hutt as Gaev, Douglas Campbell as Lopakhin, and William Needles as Yepihodov. The cast featured Frances Hyland as Varya, Kate Reid as Ranevskaya, and Martha Henry as Dunyasha, Powys Thomas as Fiers, Mervyn Blake as Pishtchik, and Bruno Gerussi as Yasha.
- 1973: The first production of The Cherry Orchard by the National Theatre in London was at the Old Vic in May 1973, using a translation by Ronald Hingley. The director was Michael Blakemore; the cast included Constance Cummings (Ranevskaya), Michael Hordern (Gaev), and Denis Quilley (Lopakhin).
- 1977: A production opened at Lincoln Center for the Performing Arts in 1977. It starred Irene Worth as Ranevskaya, Raul Julia as Lopakhin, Mary Beth Hurt as Anya, and Meryl Streep as Dunyasha. The production was directed by Andrei Șerban, and it featured Tony Award–winning costumes and set by Santo Loquasto.
- 1978: A production appeared at the National Theatre in London in 1978. It was directed by Peter Hall and translated by Michael Frayn; it starred Dorothy Tutin as Ranevskaya, Robert Stephens as Gaev, Albert Finney as Lopakhin, Terence Rigby as Simeonov-Pishchik, Ben Kingsley as Trofimov, and Ralph Richardson (later Robin Bailey) as Firs. Also in 1978, a minimalist production opened at the Riverside Studios in London. It was directed by Peter Gill, with a cast including Judy Parfitt as Ranevskaya, Stephen Rea as Trofimov, and Julie Covington as Varya.
- 1981: In 1981, Peter Brook mounted a production in French (titled La Cérisaie) with an international cast including Brook's wife Natasha Parry as Ranevskaya, Niels Arestrup as Lopakhin, and Michel Piccoli as Gayev. The production was remounted at the Brooklyn Academy of Music in 1988, after tours through Africa and the Middle East.
- 1985: Mike Alfreds was both translator and director for a production at the National Theatre in December 1985. The cast included Sheila Hancock (Ranyevskaya), Edward Petherbridge (Gaev), Ian McKellen (Lopakhin), Eleanor Bron (Varya), Roy Kinnear (Simeonov-Pishchik), and Hugh Lloyd (Firs).
- 1987 and 1998: The Stratford Festival's 1987 production also used the Trevor Griffiths text, and it subtly shifted the play's emphasis from Madame Ranyevskaya's economic demise to the ascent of Lopakhin. James Blendick as Lopakhin was praised for his skilful man-on-the-rise performance. The 1998 festival production, directed by Diana Leblanc, was based on a new translation by John Murell. Among its cast were Martha Henry as Ranevskaya and Stephen Russell as Leonid. Variety commented that "Leblanc has ... remembered that this is a tragicomedy ... avoided the obvious and encouraged her actors to find humor rather than high drama. It works beautifully because there is drama aplenty in merely playing these characters with integrity."
- 1991: A Welsh language version, Y Gelli Geirios, was translated by W. Gareth Jones; it was first performed on 19 February 1991 by Cwmni Theatr Gwynedd in Theatr Gwynedd, Bangor.
- 1995: Ludwik Margules, founder and artistic director of El Foro. Teatro Contemporáneo in Mexico City, directed a production of the play at the venue featuring Yael Michal (Anya).
- 1995: The RSC's second production of the play was staged in July 1995 at the Swan Theatre, Stratford-upon-Avon—and later at the Albery Theatre, London—using the translation by Gill. Adrian Noble directed a cast including Penelope Wilton (Ranevskaya), Alec McCowen (Gaev), David Troughton (Lopakhin), and Peter Copley (Firs).
- 1998–1999: Alain Françon directed a French-language production at the Odéon-Théâtre de l'Europe in Paris, starring Dominique Valadié (Ranevskaya).

=== 21st century ===
==== 2000–2009 ====
- 2005: The Steppenwolf Theatre Company (Chicago) performed a version that was translated by its Associate Artistic Director, Curt Columbus, and directed by ensemble member Tina Landau. The play premiered on 4 November 2004 and ran until 5 March 2005 at the Upstairs Theatre. Appearing in the performance were Robert Breuler, Francis Guinan, Amy Morton, Yasen Peyankov, Rondi Reed, Anne Adams, Guy Adkins, Chaon Cross, Leonard Kraft, Julian Martinez, Ned Noyes, Elizabeth Rich, Ben Viccellio, and Chris Yonan.
- 2005: In 2005, the Atlantic Theatre Company (New York City) produced a new adaptation of The Cherry Orchard by Tom Donaghy, where much more of the comedy was present as the playwright had originally intended.
- 2006: A production of the play starring Annette Bening as Ranevskaya and Alfred Molina as Lopakhin, translated by Martin Sherman and directed by Sean Mathias, opened at the Mark Taper Forum in Los Angeles in February 2006.
- 2007: The Huntington Theatre Company at Boston University produced a version in January 2007 using Richard Nelson's translation; it was directed by Nicholas Martin, with Kate Burton as Madame Ranevskaya, Joyce Van Patten as Charlotta Ivanovna, and Dick Latessa as Firs.
- 2007: Libby Appel adapted and directed the play in 2007 for her farewell season as artistic director of the Oregon Shakespeare Festival (Ashland, Oregon). The new translation, based on an original literal translation by Allison Horsley, is considered to be "strongly Americanized".
- 2008: A version of the play was performed as the opening production on the Chichester Festival Theatre Stage in May–June 2008; the cast included Dame Diana Rigg, Frank Finlay, Natalie Cassidy, Jemma Redgrave, and Maureen Lipman.
- 2009: In 2009, a new version of the play by Tom Stoppard was performed as the first production of The Bridge Project, a partnership between North American and UK theatres. The play ran at the Brooklyn Academy of Music. Sam Mendes directed the production with a cast including Simon Russell Beale, Sinéad Cusack, Richard Easton, Rebecca Hall, and Ethan Hawke.
- 2009: A completely new adaptation of the play was produced by the Blackeyed Theatre in spring 2009 as a UK tour, with a cast of four actors.

==== 2010–2019 ====
- 2010: A new adaptation was commissioned by the Brighton Festival and performed by the Dreamthinkspeak group. They renovated the old Co-op department store on London Road using the entire store as a stage. They retitled the play to Before I Sleep and stated that the new title was inspired by the original play. The production received positive reviews from The Guardian and The Independent newspapers.
- 2010: In April 2010, at the Royal Lyceum Theatre in Edinburgh, the Scottish playwright John Byrne staged a new version of the play; it was staged as a Scottish 'social comedy', taking place in 1979 Scotland.
- 2011: The National Theatre in London staged a new version starring Zoë Wanamaker from May to August 2011, reuniting director Howard Davies with writer Andrew Upton; the production was also shown at cinemas internationally through National Theatre Live.
- 2012: The Theatre Workshop of Nantucket staged a new adaptation and translation that was set on Nantucket, Massachusetts, in 1972. The play premiered on 14 September 2012. It was directed by Anne Breeding and Gregory Stroud, and it was translated and adapted by Gregory Stroud.
- 2013: The Stage Center Theatre at Northeastern Illinois University (Chicago) presented a new version, adapted and directed by Dan Wirth, in October 2013.
- 2014: PK Productions premiered a new version in November 2014 at the New Wimbledon Theatre. Adapted by director Patrick Kennedy, the production updates the setting to London in 1976.
- 2016: Clemence Williams directed the New Theatre (Sydney, Australia) in a production of David Mamet's adaptation; the production ran from 26 April through 28 May 2016, with an original musical score by Eliza Scott.
- 2016: Roundabout Theatre Company presented a new adaptation by Stephen Karam on Broadway at the American Airlines Theatre, starring Diane Lane as Ranevskaya. Previews began on 15 September 2016, with opening night on 16 October. The production was directed by Simon Godwin, with scenic design by Scott Pask, costume design by Michael Krass, lighting design by Donald Holder, sound design by Christopher Cronin, movement by Jonathan Goddard, and original music by Nico Muhly.
- 2018: During its 2018 season, the Shaw Festival in Niagara-on-the-Lake, Ontario, presented a world premiere of The Orchard (after Chekov). Described as The Cherry Orchard transformed into the tale of a Punjabi-Sikh family fighting to hold onto their Okanagan Valley orchard, this version is based on the author Sarena Parmar's childhood in British Columbia. The playbill notes that "This fresh adaptation confronts life, loss and the Canadian immigrant experience with both bravery and beauty..."

==== 2020–present ====
- 2020: The Moscow Pushkin Drama Theatre was scheduled to present its adaptation of the play with the Cherry Orchard Festival at the New York City Center in June 2020. Directed by Vladimir Mirzoev and starring Victoria Isakova, Aleksander Petrov, Mikhail Zhigalov, and Maxim Vitorgan, the production was described as "Visually striking, psychologically nuanced and hypnotically performed Russian staging of Chekhov's play". The performances were cancelled because of the COVID-19 pandemic.
- 2022: An English language adaptation by Vinay Patel, in a science fiction setting, was performed at The Yard Theatre in London in 2022.
- 2026: For its 2025–2026 season, the Royal Shakespeare Company staged a production directed by Tamara Harvey at the Swan Theatre, starring Kenneth Branagh and Helen Hunt as Lopakhin and Ranyevskaya respectively.
- 2026–2027: Another staged production was directed by Ian Rickson at the Harold Pinter Theatre in London, UK. It starred Kristin Scott Thomas and Stephen Mangan as Ranyevskaya and Lopakhin respectively, and ran between 3 October 2026 and 9 January 2027.

== Adaptations ==
=== Television ===
- 1959: A television version was broadcast as part of the syndicated The Play of the Week television series in 1959; it featured Helen Hayes as Ranevskaya and Susan Strasberg as Anya, and it was directed by Daniel Petrie.
- 1962: A Royal Shakespeare Company / BBC Television version in 1962 was directed by Michael Elliott from a Michel Saint-Denis stage production. This version featured Peggy Ashcroft as Ranevskaya, Ian Holm as Trofimov, John Gielgud as Gayev, Judi Dench as Anya, Dorothy Tutin as Varya, and Patsy Byrne as Dunyasha. It has been released on DVD by BBC Worldwide.
- 1981: In 1981, the BBC produced a version for British television; it was written by Trevor Griffiths from a translation by Helen Rappaport and directed by Richard Eyre. Rather than reprising her 1962 BBC role as daughter Anya, Judi Dench here played the mother Ranevskaya to Bill Paterson's Lopakhin, with Anton Lesser as Trofimov, Frederick Treves as Gayev, Anna Massey as Charlotta, and a 24-year-old Timothy Spall as Yepikhodov.

=== Film ===
- 1999: A film version directed by Michael Cacoyannis appeared in 1999; it starred Charlotte Rampling as Ranevskaya, Alan Bates as Gayev, Owen Teale as Lopakhin, Melanie Lynskey as Dunyasha, and Gerard Butler as Yasha.
- 2002: An L.A. Theatre Works recorded version of the play was produced in 2002; it starred Marsha Mason, Charles Durning, Hector Elizondo, and Jennifer Tilly. Other actors in the cast were Jordan Baker, Jon Chardiet, Michael Cristofer, Tim DeKay, Jeffrey Jones, Christy Keef, Amy Pietz, and Joey Slotnick.
- 2002: In 2002, Wekande Walauwa—a Sinhalese film adapted to the Sri Lankan family context—was directed by the prominent Sri Lankan director Lester James Peries.

=== Other media ===
- 2018: A new radio version was produced for BBC's Drama on 3 programme by Katherine Tozer and composer John Chambers; it first aired on 18 October 2018.
- 2020: An English-language adaptation as a visual novel, produced by Manuela Malasaña, was released in November 2020.
- 2022: In 2022, a high-tech adaptation titled The Orchard was presented at the Baryshnikov Arts Center, featuring Mikhail Baryshnikov and Jessica Hecht.

== Legacy ==
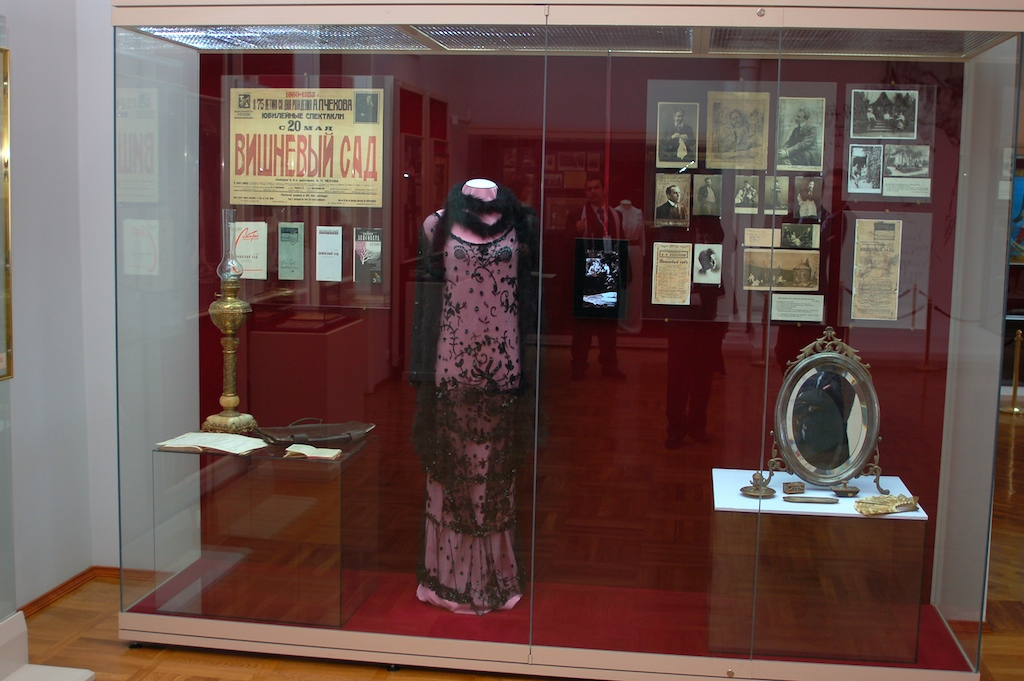
The Cherry Orchard memorabilia at the Chekhov Gymnasium literary museum.

The Japanese manga Sakura no Sono (1985–1986), along with its live-action film adaptations, centers on a drama group at a girls-only private high school who stage a production of The Cherry Orchard.

The Cherry Orchard is featured in the comedy film Henry's Crime (2011).

== Editions ==
=== English translations ===
- Chekhov, Anton (1994). "The Cherry Orchard". In Gilbert, Miriam; Klaus, Carl H.; Field, Jr., Bradford S. (eds.). Modern and Contemporary Drama. David Magarshack (translation). New York: St. Martin's Press. ISBN 0-312-09077-3.
- Chekhov, Anton (1998). The Cherry Orchard. Stephen Mulrine (translation). London: Nick Hern Books. ISBN 978-1-85459-412-9.
- Chekhov, Anton (2015). The Cherry Orchard. Richard Pevear and Larissa Volokhonsky (translation). New York: Theatre Communications Group. ISBN 9781559364843.
- Chekhov, Anton (2016). The Cherry Orchard. Stephen Karam and Alison Horsley (translation). New York: Theatre Communications Group. ISBN 9781559365512. OCLC 1013526785.

== Sources ==
- Barda, Any; Annick Benoît (1991). "La Cerisaie d'hier". La cerisaie: texte intégral (in French). Paris: Hachette. OCLC 1009553062.
- Gottlieb, Vera (4 November 2000). The Cambridge Companion to Chekhov. Cambridge: Cambridge University Press. ISBN 0-521-58917-7.
- Miles, Patrick (1993). Chekhov on the British Stage. Cambridge: Cambridge University Press. ISBN 0-521-38467-2.
