= Gerrie =

Gerrie may refer to:

- Gerrie (given name), a unisex given name
- Syd Gerrie (born 1927), Scottish footballer

== See also ==
- Garrie (disambiguation)
- Gerri (disambiguation)
- Gerry (disambiguation)
- Jerrie
