= Garry =

Garry may refer to:

== Names ==
- Gary (given name) or Garry
- Garry (surname)

== Places ==
- Cape Garry, South Shetlands
- Fort Garry, Winnipeg, a district in Winnipeg, Manitoba, Canada
- Garry Lake, Nunavut, Canada
- Rural Municipality of Garry No. 245, Saskatchewan, Canada
- Garry River, New Zealand
- Loch Garry, Scotland
- River Garry, Inverness-shire, Scotland
- River Garry, Perthshire, Scotland

== See also ==
- Garry's Mod, a sandbox physics game
- Garaidh
- Garath (disambiguation)
- Gareth (given name)
- Garri (disambiguation)
- Garrie (disambiguation)
- Gary (disambiguation)
- Ghari (disambiguation)
