= Gary (surname) =

Gary is a surname. Notable people with the surname include:

- Arthur Gary (1914–2005), American radio and television announcer
- Bruce Gary (1951–2006), American drummer
- Carlton Gary (1950–2018), American serial killer and rapist
- Cleveland Gary (born 1966), American football player
- Dairese Gary (born 1988), American basketball player
- Donald A. Gary (1901–1977), American U.S. Naval officer, recipient of the Medal of Honor
- Elbert Henry Gary (1846–1927), American lawyer, county judge and corporate officer
- Frank B. Gary (1860–1922), American politician
- George Gary (1824–1909), American politician and judge in Wisconsin
- Greg Gary (basketball), American college basketball coach
- Greg Gary (Canadian football) (born 1958), former Canadian gridiron football linebacker and current coach
- Guilian Gary (born 1980), American football player and coach
- Henry Gary, English governor of Bombay, 1667–1668
- James Albert Gary (1833–1920), American politician
- Jim Gary (1939–2006), American sculptor
- Joe Gary (born 1959), American football player
- John Gary (1932—1998), American singer
- John G. Gary (born 1943), American politician
- Joseph Gary (1821–1906), American judge in anarchist trial
- Justin Gary, American digital card game champion
- J. Vaughan Gary (1892–1973), American politician
- Keith Gary (born 1959), American football player
- Linda Gary (1944–1995), American voice actor and voice-over artist
- Lorraine Gary (born 1937), American actress
- Marianne Gary-Schaffhauser (1903–1992), Austrian composer
- Martin Witherspoon Gary (1831–1881), American brigadier general in the Confederate States Army
- Mike Gary (1900–1969), American athlete and coach
- Nancy E. Gary (1937–2006), American dean of a U.S. medical school
- Olandis Gary (born 1975), American football player
- Pnina Gary (1927–2023) Israeli actress and theatre director
- Rashan Gary (born 1997), American football player
- Raymond D. Gary (1908–1993), American politician, Oklahoma
- Romain Gary (1914–1980), French diplomat, novelist, film director and World War II aviator
- Russell Gary (1959–2019), American football player
- Sam Gary (1917–1986), American blues, spiritual and folk singer
- Willie Gary (American football) (born 1978), American football player

== See also ==
- Frank Gehry (1929–2025), Canadian and American architect and designer
