= Qara =

Qara may refer to:

== Places ==
- Al Qara, a governorate in Al Bahah Region, Saudi Arabia
- Qara, Syria, a Syrian city
- Qara Oasis, Egypt

== Persons ==
- Qara Iskander, ruled the Kara Koyunlu or Black Sheep Turcoman tribe from 1420 to 1436
- Qara Mahammad Töremish, bey of Kara Koyunlu and father of Qara Yusuf
- Qara Osman (reigned 1378–1435), late 14th and early 15th-century leader of the Turkoman tribal federation of Aq Qoyunlu in what is now eastern Turkey, Iran, Azerbaijan and Iraq
- Qara Shemsi Abdal, a 19th-century Ottoman poet
- Qara Yusuf (c. 1356 – 1420), ruler of the Kara Koyunlu dynasty or Black Sheep Turkomans from c.1388 to 1420

== See also ==
- Qara Khitai
- Kara (disambiguation)
- Ghara (disambiguation)
