= Gaddi (name) =

Gaddi is both a surname and a given name.

== Gaddi surname ==
- Agnolo Gaddi (c. 1350 – 1396), Florentine painter
- Caterina Gaddi (born 2008), Italian artistic gymnast
- Clemente Gaddi (1901–1993), an Italian Roman Catholic prelate
- Gaddo Gaddi (c. 1239 – c. 1312), Florentine mosaicist and painter
- Giovanni Gaddi (priest) (1493–1542), owner of the Hellenistic Greek marble Gaddi Torso
- Giovanni Gaddi (painter) (fl. 1333 - 1383), Florentine painter
- Jacopo Gaddi (c. 1600 - after 1658), Florentine poet
- Taddeo Gaddi (c. 1290 – 1366), Florentine painter
- Lalbabu Raut Gaddhi (born 1966), first and current Chief Minister of Province No. 2 of Federal Democratic Republic of Nepal.

=== Familial relationships ===
Among the notable people, Gaddo Gaddi was the father of Taddeo Gaddi. Taddeo was the father of Agnola Gaddi and Giovanni Gaddi, both notable painters listed here.

== Gaddi given name ==
- Gaddi Vasquez (born 1955), director of the United States Peace Corps, 2002–06, U.S. Ambassador to the United Nations Agencies for Food and Agriculture, 2006–09
