= Gaari =

Gaari may refer to:

- Gaari people, an indigenous Australian people
- Gaari language, an Australian language
- Gadaria or Gaari, a caste of India

== See also ==
- Gari (disambiguation)
- Juriën Gaari (born 1993), footballer
