= Gari (name) =

Gari is a given name, nickname and surname. It may refer to:

- Gari Buruka (born 1997), Papua New Guinean woman cricketer
- Gari Cappelli (born 1961), Croatian politician and Minister of Tourism
- Gari Mea (born 1976), former Papua New Guinean woman cricketer
- Julius Garibaldi Gari Melchers (1860–1932), American painter
- Gari Moka (born 1983), Papua New Guinean footballer
- Gari Scott (born 1978), American former National Football League player
- Garikoitz Gari Uranga (born 1980), Spanish retired footballer
- Giulio Gari (1909–1994), Austro-Hungarian operatic tenor
- Roba Gari (born 1982), Ethiopian runner who specializes in the 3000-metre steeplechase

== See also ==
- Garí (surname)
