= Gary Jones =

Gary Jones may refer to:

== Arts and entertainment ==
- Gary Jones (costume designer) (born 1947), American costume designer
- Gary Jones (actor) (born 1958), Welsh actor
- Gary Jones (journalist), British tabloid journalist

== Sports ==
=== Association football (soccer) ===
- Gary Jones (footballer, born 1951), English footballer with Everton
- Gary Jones (footballer, born 1969), English footballer, played for Southend United, Notts County, Halifax Town
- Gary Jones (footballer, born 1975), English footballer, played for Tranmere Rovers, Nottingham Forest and Grimsby Town
- Gary Jones (footballer, born 1977), English footballer, Rochdale record appearance holder, League Cup runner up with Bradford City, currently plays for Southport

=== Other sports ===
- Gary F. Jones (1944–2020), American trainer of Thoroughbred racehorses
- Gary Jones (pitcher) (born 1945), American baseball pitcher for the New York Yankees
- Gary Jones (motorcyclist) (born 1952), American national champion motocross racer
- Gary Jones (baseball manager) (born 1960), American minor league baseball manager and player
- Gary Jones (rugby union) (born 1960), Welsh rugby union player
- Gary Jones (American football) (born 1967), American NFL football player
- Gary Jones (boxer) (born 1975), English boxer

== Others ==
- Gary Jones (nurse) (born 1953), British registered nurse and Fellow of the Royal College of Nursing
- Gary Jones (Oklahoma politician) (born 1954), American politician, Oklahoma State Auditor and Inspector
- Gary Jones (unionist) (born 1956), American labor unionist and convicted felon

== See also ==
- Gareth Jones (disambiguation)
- Garry Jones (1950–2016), English footballer
- Garry Jones (cyclist) (born 1940), Australian cyclist
