= Jerri (given name) =

Jerri is a given name. Notable people with the name include:

- Jerri Allyn (born 1954), American artist
- Jerri Bergström (born 1963), Swedish fencer
- Jerri Manthey (born 1970), American actress
- Jerri Mumford (1909–2002), Canadian military servicewoman during World War II
- Jerri Nielsen (1952–2009), American physician
- Jerri Winters (21st century), American singer
