= Gadi =

Gadi may refer to:

== Places ==
- Gadi, the traditional land of the Gadigal people
- Gadi, Nepal, a village development committee in Parsa District in the Narayani Zone of southern Nepal
- Gadi Bayalkada, a village development committee in Surkhet District in the Bheri Zone of mid-western Nepal

== People ==
- Chris Gadi (born 1992), French footballer
- Gadi Brumer (born 1973), Israeli footballer who played for Maccabi Tel Aviv
- Gadi Eisenkot (born 1960), general in the Israel Defense Forces
- Gadi Kinda (1994–2025), Israeli footballer
- Gadi Schwartz (born 1983), American journalist
- Gadi Shamni (born 1959), general in the Israel Defense Forces
- Gadi Taub (born 1965), Israeli historian, author, screenwriter, and political commentator
- Gadi Yatziv (1937–2004), Israeli academic and politician

== Other uses ==
- Gadi, a throne in South Asia
- House of Gadi, a dynasty of kings of the Northern Kingdom of Israel
- Gaɗi language, spoken in Nigeria
- Gaddi language, spoken in India
- Gadi tribe, an ethnic group of India

== See also ==
- Gaddi (disambiguation)
- Ghadi (disambiguation)
- Swaminarayan Gadi (disambiguation)
