= Ghari =

Ghari may refer to:

- Ghari language, an Austronesian language of the Solomon Islands
- Ghari Bridge, Tabriz, Iran
- Ghari village, Mansehra District, Pakistan
- Ghari (sweet), a sweet from Surat, Gujarat, India
- Ghari (story), a story by Premendra Mitra
- Ghari, Nigeria, a Local Government Area in Kano State

== See also ==
- Gari (disambiguation)
- Garre, a Somali clan
- Garry (disambiguation)
- Gharry, a horse-drawn carriage in India
- Ghadi (disambiguation)
- Ghara (disambiguation)
