= Gerry (disambiguation) =

Gerry is both a surname and a given name.

Gerry may also refer to:

== Places ==
- Gerry, New York, U.S.
- Gerry Branch, a river in Tennessee
- Gerry, Massachusetts, a city in the United States which later changed its name to Phillipston

== Films ==
- Gerry (2002 film), by Gus Van Sant
- Gerry (2011 film), a biographical film by Alain Desrochers about Gerry Boulet

== Other uses ==
- Gerry (company), an American manufacturer of outdoor sports gear

== See also ==
- Ugly Gerry
- Jerry (disambiguation)
- Geri (disambiguation)
- Gery (disambiguation)
- Gerri (disambiguation)
- Gerrie (disambiguation)
