= Gareth Hopkins (footballer) =

English footballer

Personal information
- Date of birth: 14 June 1980 (age 46)
- Place of birth: Cheltenham, England
- Height: 6 ft 3 in (1.91 m)
- Position: Striker

Team information
- Current team: Bishop's Cleeve
- Number: 9

Senior career*
Years	Team	Apps	(Gls)
1998–2002	Cheltenham Town	8	(0)
2001	→ Cinderford Town (loan)		
2001–2002	→ Bath City (loan)		
2002	→ Forest Green Rovers (loan)	8	(0)
2002–2006	Cirencester Town		
2006–2008	Weston-super-Mare		
2008–	Bishop's Cleeve		
- * Club domestic league appearances and goals as of 20:56, 23 April 2008 (PDT)

Gareth Hopkins (born 14 June 1980) is an English football striker who plays for Bishop's Cleeve.
