= Marwa Al-Sabouni =

Syrian architect

- Born: 18 September 1981 (age 45); Homs, Syria
- Known for: Architecture
- Awards: BBC 100 Women

Books:

The Battle For Home: The Memoir of a Syrian Architect https://www.thamesandhudson.com/products/the-battle-for-home?srsltid=AU7gw4ULINy0HmT6Pe-uQgskkB8bQeElBZMCa5540E6xTgCmaELp5KsN

Building for Hope: Towards an Architecture of Belonging https://www.thamesandhudson.com/products/building-for-hope?srsltid=AU7gw4VKt2czuSTr1bfGjYJjLr6Gdzdavc0GUllSl5nuSmiB-iSxV9ms

Mosque: An Architect's Exploration of Form, Faith, and Meaning

https://www.thamesandhudson.com/products/mosque?srsltid=AU7gw4XDl2HAdwgeAxCH2NjtaRn_RZp3de1lw7T7i9plLCuxj3lbwewo

Marwa Al-Sabouni (Arabic: مروة الصابوني; born 18 September 1981) is a Syrian architect and writer. She believes that architecture plays a role in maintaining a city's peace. Her first book, The Battle for Home, was selected by The Guardian as one of the top architectural books of 2016. She was selected as one of the BBC 100 Women in 2019.

== Early life and education ==
Al-Sabouni was born in Homs. She has claimed that in Syria the students with the highest grades study medicine, whilst those achieving lower grades study engineering. Al-Sabouni would go on to study architecture. Al-Sabouni noticed that there were no functioning parks or cultural spaces close to where she lived. She has spoken about her early life to The Guardian, "I had no illusions of being the next Zaha Hadid...Nevertheless, hope is blind, and always manages to find its way into the human heart, mine included". She holds a bachelor's and doctoral degree in architecture, and has called Frank Lloyd Wright one of her inspirations. Her undergraduate training involved copying Western styles, such as the American homes in Cape Cod, from library books. Her doctoral dissertation, Stereotyping in Islamic Architecture, was featured on deconarch.com.

== Career ==
When the Syrian Civil War broke out in 2011, Al-Sabouni made the decision to stay in the city she had grown up in. She spent two years hiding inside, home-schooling her two young children and not seeing the moon. When the rebel forces left Syria in 2015 over 60% of the neighbourhood was left in rubble. She has spoken about the housing crisis in Syria, with almost half of the Syrian population living in temporary accommodation or informal housing, and how the architecture contributed to its downfall. Al-Sabouni believes that the architecture of cities are fundamental to their harmony.

Al-Sabouni's autobiography, The Battle for Home: The Vision of a Young Architect in Syria was released in 2016. It considers the roles of architects and city planners in violence and civil conflict by corrupting community relationships through piecemeal buildings. She argues that efforts must be made to restore peace through urban developments. It includes her proposals for the rebuild of the Baba Amr district, designing structures that draw on Syria's historical ways to keep communities living together harmoniously. Her design includes tree units that contain shops and community spaces in trunks, as well as apartments on their branches. Her efforts look to restore social cohesion and a sense of identity. It was selected by The Guardian as one of the top architectural books of 2016.

Her 2021 book, Building for Hope: Towards an Architecture of Belonging, was published by Thames & Hudson.

She co-runs with her husband (a fellow architect) an online space that communicates architectural news in Arabic, the Arabic gate for architectural news, as well as a bookshop in Homs. In 2016 she delivered a TED talk, How Syria's architecture laid the foundation for a brutal war, that has been viewed over one million times. She has provided expert advice to the World Economic Forum and for NPR and the BBC, as well as writing for The Wall Street Journal.

=== Awards and honours ===
Her awards and honours include;

- 2010 Royal Kuwaiti award for best media project
- 2013 UN-Habitat Scroll of Honour Award
- 2017 The Observer Popular Features Award
- 2018 Pritzker Architecture Prize finalist
- 2018 Prince Claus Fund Laureate
- 2019 BBC 100 Women

== Personal life ==
Al-Sabouni is married to Ghassan Jansiz, with whom she has a daughter and son.
