= Gari (vehicle) =

Horse-drawn cart

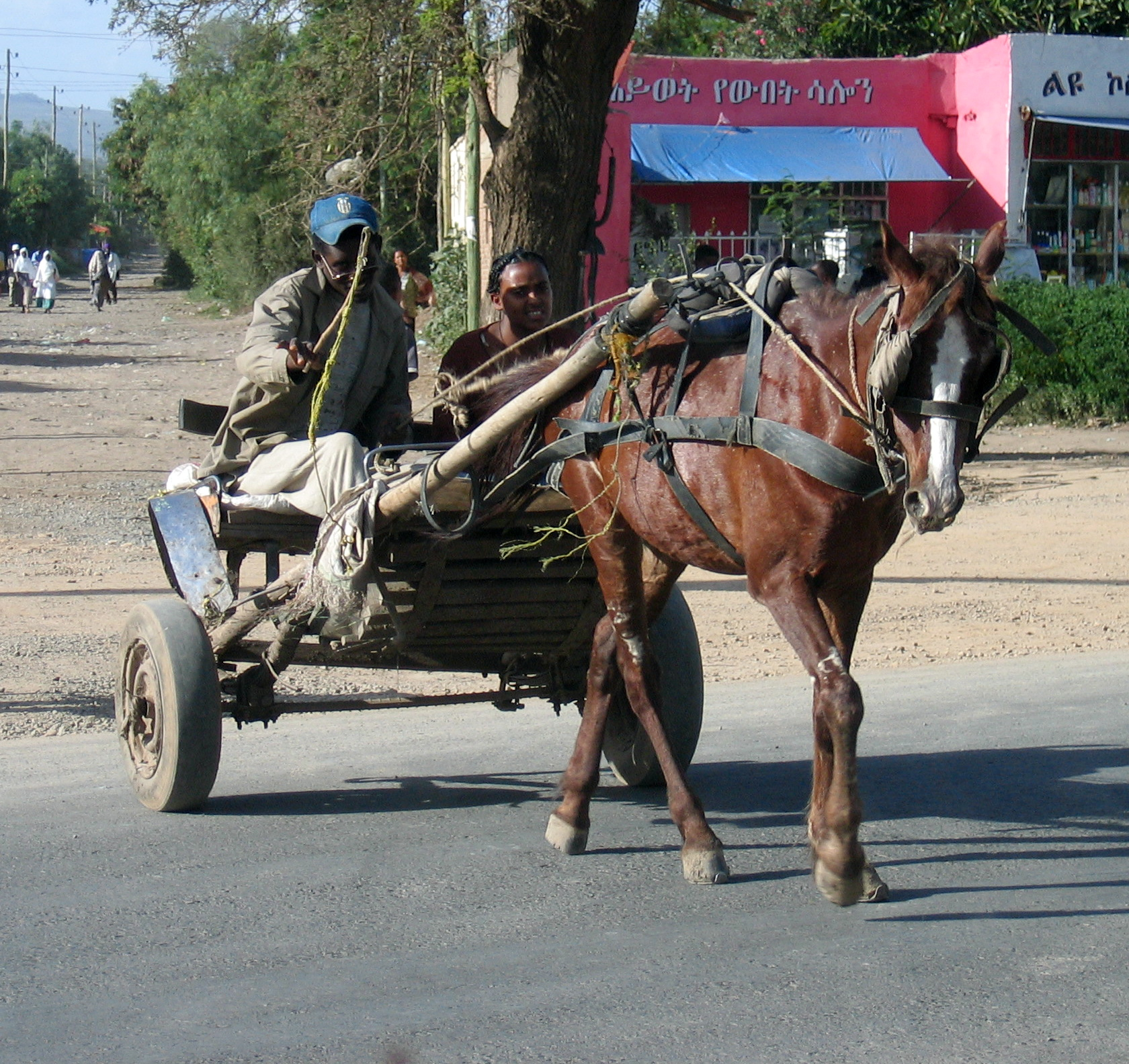
A gari crosses the busy Addis Ababa-Dire Dawa Road in Adama, Ethiopia.

A gari (Swahili for 'cart'; Amharic: ጋሪ) is a horse-drawn cart. Garis typically have two wheels with rubber tires, are pulled by one horse, and can carry two passengers plus the driver. Within towns and cities, they function as taxicabs.
