= W. Gareth Jones =

Welsh academic and translator

W. Gareth Jones (born November 1936) is a Welsh academic and translator of Russian works into Welsh. He was born in the Swansea Valley and graduated from Cambridge University with degrees in Russian and French. Jones was a correspondent for the Western Mail and currently holds the position of Professor of Russian at the University of Wales, Bangor.

He has produced Welsh translations of works by Chekhov (Y Gelli Geirios, Gwylan, Storïau Tramor IV), Solzhenitsyn (Un Diwrnod Ifan Denisofitsh), Aitmatov, and others and published critical works in English on Russian literature.

== Selected works ==
- Nikolay Novikov : enlightener of Russia. (Cambridge University Press, 1984).
- Tolstoi and Britain. (Berg Publishers, 1995.)
