= Gareth Morgan (painter) =

British artist

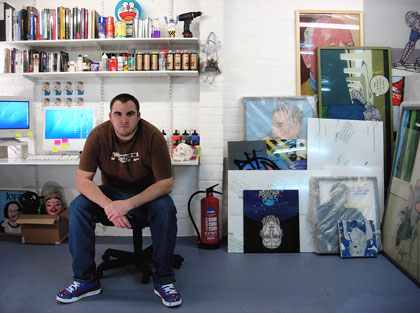

Gareth Morgan is a British artist known for his acrylic on Perspex paintings of a robotic man. He is a Fine Arts graduate of Goldsmiths College in London, and is based in the United Kingdom. He has exhibited extensively all over the United Kingdom as well as in Moscow, Tel Aviv and Sotheby's in Amsterdam.
