= Gareth Williams (cricketer) =

English cricketer (born 1973)

Personal information
- Full name: Gareth John Williams
- Born: 12 December 1973 (age 52); Birmingham, Warwickshire, England
- Nickname: Gaz
- Height: 6 ft 1 in (1.85 m)
- Batting: Left-handed
- Bowling: Right-arm fast-medium
- Role: Opening Bowler

Domestic team information
- Years: Team
- 2001-2003: Worcestershire Cricket Board

Career statistics
Competition	LA
Matches	5
Runs scored	0
Batting average	0
100s/50s	–/–
Top score	0*
Balls bowled	213
Wickets	5
Bowling average	28.20
5 wickets in innings	–
10 wickets in match	–
Best bowling	3/61
Catches/stumpings	–/–
- Source: Cricinfo, 2 November 2010

Gareth John Williams (born 12 December 1973) is a former English cricketer. Williams was a left-handed batsman who bowled right-arm fast-medium. He was born in Birmingham, Warwickshire.

Williams represented the Worcestershire Cricket Board in List A cricket. His debut List A match against Staffordshire in the 2001 Cheltenham & Gloucester Trophy. From 2001 to 2003, he represented the Board in 5 List A matches, the last of which came against Worcestershire in the 2003 Cheltenham & Gloucester Trophy. In his 5 List A matches, he took 5 wickets at a bowling average of 28.20, with best figures of 3/61.
