= Gareth Rees =

Gareth Rees may refer to:

- Gareth Rees (cricketer) (born 1985), Welsh cricketer
- Gareth Rees (motorsport commentator) (born 1969), Welsh motorsport commentator
- Gareth Rees (rugby union) (born 1967), former Canadian rugby player
