= Gareth Roberts =

Gareth Roberts may refer to:

- Gareth Roberts (physicist) (1940–2007), British physicist, engineer, and President of Wolfson College, Oxford
- Gareth Roberts (rugby union) (born 1959), Welsh rugby player
- Gareth Roberts (writer) (born 1968), British television writer
- Gareth Roberts (footballer) (born 1978), Welsh football player
- Gareth Roberts (statistician) (born 1964), British professor and Director of the Centre for Research in Statistical Methodology at University of Warwick
- Gareth Roberts (co-driver) (1987–2012), Welsh rally co-driver
- Gareth Roberts (politician) (born 1971), British politician

== See also ==
- Garreth Roberts (born 1960), English footballer
