= Gaddi sheep =

Breed of sheep

- Country of origin: India
- Use: Wool

Traits
- Wool color: Usually white; sometimes a mix of tan, brown, and black
- Horn status: Males horned, ewes usually polled

Gaddi is a breed of domesticated sheep found in India. They are one of eight different breeds of sheep found in the northern temperate area of India. The Gaddi is raised primarily for its wool.

== Characteristics ==
The Gaddi ram is horned while the ewes are found horned only 10 - 15% of the time. The tail is small and thin. The breed is considered medium-sized. The Gaddi ewe averages 56 cm at the withers and weighs on average 26.5 kg. Lambs at birth weigh 2.5 kg and there is no difference in average birth weight between rams or ewes. This breed is small in size. It is strong and a good climber. Ears are also short. Fleece is fine and can grow up to 5cm length. Fleece is clipped three times a year (Feb, June and October). Fleece yield is 1–1.5kg/year. Wool is used for making shawls and blankets.

Generally, the breed is uncolored and white. Occasionally, the Gaddi can be found mixed tan, brown and black.
