= Swaminarayan Gadi =

Swaminarayan Gadi may refer to different "seats" of the Swaminarayan Sampraday, a Hindu sect:

- Swaminarayan Gadi
- Lakshmi Narayan Dev Gadi
- Nar Narayan Dev Gadi
