= Marianne Gary-Schaffhauser =

Austrian composer

Marianne Gary-Schaffhauser (19 July 1903 – 3 November 1992) was an Austrian composer. She was born in Vienna and studied voice and piano at the Vienna Academy, and composition with Alfred Uhl. Later she studied at Vienna University and graduated with a PhD. After completing her studies, she taught as a professor of German and history, but retired in 1948 to work as a composer.

== Works ==
Selected works include:

- Oratorium von Leid und Heldentum der Ungenannten, for soloists, choir and orchestra
- Cello Concerto (1957)
- Piano Concerto (1966)
- Dance Suite for Orchestra (1967)
