= Gari, Kruševac =

Coordinates: 43°32′N 21°18′E

Gari (Kruševac)
- Village
- Interactive map of Gari (Kruševac)
- Country: Serbia
- District: Rasina District
- Municipality: Kruševac

Population (2002)
  - Total: 535
- Time zone: UTC+1 (CET)
  - Summer (DST): UTC+2 (CEST)

Gari is a village in the municipality of Kruševac, Serbia. According to the 2002 census, the village has a population of 535 people.
