= Garri (given name) =

Garri is a masculine given name. Notable people with the name include:

- Garri Aiba (died 2004), Abkhazian politician
- Garri Bardin (born 1941), Russian director, screenwriter, producer, and actor
