= Gari, Rodnikovsky District, Ivanovo Oblast =

Gari Гари
- Village
- Location within Ivanovo Oblast Location within Russia
- Coordinates: 57°07′N 41°52′E
- Country: Russia
- Region: Ivanovo Oblast
- District: Rodnikovsky District
- Time zone: UTC+3:00

Gari (Russian: Гари) is a rural locality (a village) in Rodnikovsky District, Ivanovo Oblast, Russia. Population: 57 (2010 census);

== Geography ==
This rural locality is located 9 kilometres (5.6 mi) from Rodniki (the district's administrative centre), 56 kilometres (35 mi) from Ivanovo (capital of Ivanovo Oblast) and 298 kilometres (185 mi) from Moscow. Ganino is the nearest rural locality.
