= Garrie (surname) =

Garrie is a British surname. Notable people with the surname include:

- John Garrie (1923–1998), British actor
- Nick Garrie (born 1949), British singer-songwriter
