= Gadi Bayalkada =

Gadi Bayalkada गडी बयलकाडा
- Village development committee
- Location in Nepal
- Coordinates: 28.66°N 81.62°E
- Country: Nepal
- Province: Karnali Province
- District: Surkhet District

Population (1991)
  - Total: 3,413
- Time zone: UTC+5:45 (Nepal Time)

Gadi Bayalkada is a village development committee in Surkhet District in Karnali Province of mid-western Nepal. At the time of the 1991 Nepal census it had a population of 3413.
