= Gari, Ilyinsky District, Ivanovo Oblast =

Gari Гари
- Selo
- Location within Ivanovo Oblast Location within Russia
- Coordinates: 56°55′N 39°41′E
- Country: Russia
- Region: Ivanovo Oblast
- District: Ilyinsky District
- Time zone: UTC+3:00

Gari (Russian: Гари) is a rural locality (a selo) in Ilyinsky District, Ivanovo Oblast, Russia. Population: 381 (2010 census);

== Geography ==
This rural locality is located 7 kilometres (4.3 mi) from Ilyinskoye-Khovanskoye (the district's administrative centre), 78 kilometres (48 mi) from Ivanovo (capital of Ivanovo Oblast) and 181 kilometres (112 mi) from Moscow. Kolchigino is the nearest rural locality.
