= Garrie (given name) =

Garrie is a masculine given name. Notable people with the name include:

- Garrie Cooper (1935–1982), Australian racing driver
- Garrie Gibson (born 1954), Australian politician
- Garrie Thompson (1927–2018), record label owner, producer, and band manager
