= Dreamthinkspeak =

British theatre company

Dreamthinkspeak is a British theatre company based in Brighton, that formed in 1999. It creates and produces the work of its artistic director Tristan Sharps. Dreamthinkspeak produces immersive, site-responsive / promenade theatre.

== Productions ==
- Who Goes There?, Battersea Arts Centre, London, 2002
- Don't Look Back, South Hill Park, Bracknell, 2003
- One Step Forward, One Step Back, Liverpool Cathedral, 2008
- Before I Sleep, old Co-op building, Brighton, 2010
- Underground, Theatre Royal, Brighton, 2011
- The Rest Is Silence, Brighton Festival, Brighton and Hove, 2012; Riverside Studios, London, 2012
- In The Beginning Was The End, Somerset House, London, 2013
- Absent, Shoreditch Town Hall, London, 2015
- One Day, Maybe, King William House, Hull, 2017
- Unchain Me, Brighton Festival, Brighton and Hove, 2022
