= Gareth Griffiths =

Gareth Griffiths may refer to:

- Gareth Griffiths (rugby union) (1931–2016), Welsh rugby union player
- Gareth Griffiths (academic) (born 1943), Australian professor
- Gareth Griffiths (academic) (born 1943), Australian professor
- Gareth Griffiths (footballer) (born 1970), English former footballer
- Gareth Griffiths (field hockey) (born 1999), Welsh field hockey player
- Gareth Griffiths, a character in Fireman Sam

== See also ==
- Gareth Griffith, a Welsh artist
