= Gari, Bolshesosnovsky District, Perm Krai =

Gari Гари
- Village
- Location within Perm Krai Location within Russia
- Coordinates: 57°20′N 54°27′E
- Country: Russia
- Region: Perm Krai
- District: Bolshesosnovsky District
- Time zone: UTC+5:00

Gari (Russian: Гари) is a rural locality (a village) in Polozovoskoye Rural Settlement, Bolshesosnovsky District, Perm Krai, Russia. The population was 51 as of 2010. There are 2 streets.

== Geography ==
It is located on the Siva River.
