= Gari, Dobryanka, Perm Krai =

Gari Гари
- Village
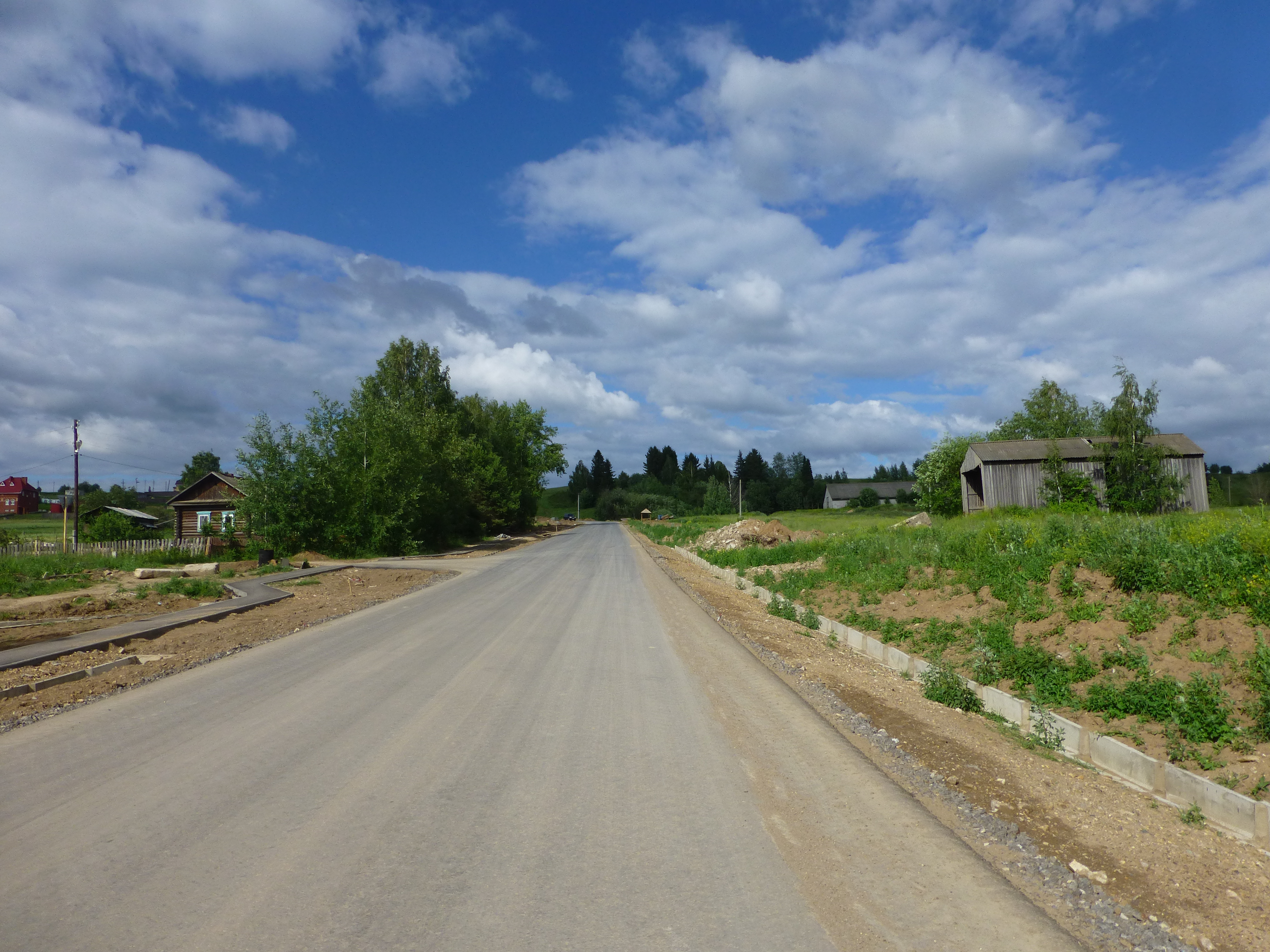
- Road leading into Gari

- Location within Perm Krai Location within Russia
- Coordinates: 58°10′N 56°33′E
- Country: Russia
- Region: Perm Krai
- District: Dobryansky District
- Time zone: UTC+5:00

Gari (Russian: Гари) is a rural locality (a village) in Dobryansky District, Perm Krai, Russia. The population was 221 as of 2010. There are 26 streets.
