= Garry Williams (theologian) =

English theologian and academic

Garry John Williams is an English theologian and academic. He is currently the director of the Pastors' Academy, formerly known as the John Owen Centre, which is part of London Seminary. Williams also lectures on Systematic Theology at London Seminary. He is also visiting professor of Historical Theology at the Westminster Theological Seminary, Adjunct Professor of Historical Theology at Puritan Reformed Theological Seminary, and Fellow in Theology and History at Greystone Theological Institute, London.

== Early life and education ==
Williams obtained his degree and masters at Christ Church, Oxford, and his doctorate at Queen's College, Oxford. His Doctorate was titled 'A Critical Exposition of Hugo Grotius’s Doctrine of the Atonement in De satisfactione Christi'.

== Career ==
Williams held the position of academic Dean at Oak Hill Theological College. In 2014 he served on the leadership at ChristChurch Harpenden, and is an ordained elder.

Williams writes extensively in theological journals and presents papers at theological conferences. His ideas are frequently the subject of debate and discussion by other theologians. His long term project is to publish a biblical, historical, and systematic study of the doctrine of penal substitutionary atonement.

== Personal ==
Williams is married and has four children.

== Works ==
Books and contributions by Garry Williams include:

- The Cross and the Punishment of Sin in Where Wrath and Mercy Meet (2001) ISBN 1-84227-079-6
- The Theology of Rowan Williams: An Outline, Critique and Consideration of Its Consequences (2002) ISBN 0-94630-749-0
- The Da Vinci Code: From Dan Brown's Fiction to Mary Magdalene's Faith (2006) ISBN 1-84550-121-7
- Penal Substitution: A Response to Recent Criticisms in The Atonement Debate (2007) ISBN 0-31027-339-0
- Silent Witnesses: Lessons on Theology, Life, and the Church from Christians of the Past (2013)
- His Love Endures Forever: Reflections on the Immeasurable Love of God (2016)
