= Gerry Branch =

Stream in Hickman County, Tennessee, U.S.

Coordinates: 35.8061783°N 87.3527897°W

Gerry Branch is a stream in Hickman County, Tennessee, in the United States. It is a tributary to the Duck River.

Gerry Branch was named for a pioneer named Gerry, who settled near the creek as early as 1830.

== See also ==
- List of rivers of Tennessee
