= Gary Williams (Australian footballer) =

Australian rules footballer

Personal information
- Full name: Gary Williams
- Born: 29 June 1950 (age 76)
- Original team: South Melbourne Tech
- Height: 183 cm (6 ft 0 in)
- Weight: 80 kg (176 lb)

Playing career^{1}
Years	Club	Games (Goals)
1969–70	South Melbourne	6 (6)
- ^{1} Playing statistics correct to the end of 1970.

Gary Williams (born 29 June 1950) is a former Australian rules footballer who played with South Melbourne in the Victorian Football League (VFL).
