= Garry Williams (Australian footballer) =

Australian rules footballer

Personal information
- Full name: Garry Williams
- Born: 17 November 1956 (age 69)
- Original team: Springvale
- Height: 187 cm (6 ft 2 in)
- Weight: 87 kg (192 lb)

Playing career^{1}
Years	Club	Games (Goals)
1979	South Melbourne	3 (0)
1980	St Kilda	2 (0)
Total		5 (0)
- ^{1} Playing statistics correct to the end of 1980.

Garry Williams (born 17 November 1956) is a former Australian rules footballer who played with South Melbourne and St Kilda in the Victorian Football League (VFL).
