= Gari, Kishertsky District, Perm Krai =

Gari Гари
- Village
- Location within Perm Krai Location within Russia
- Coordinates: 57°19′N 57°42′E
- Country: Russia
- Region: Perm Krai
- District: Kishertsky District
- Time zone: UTC+5:00

Gari (Russian: Гари) is a rural locality (a village) in Osintsevskoye Rural Settlement, Kishertsky District, Perm Krai, Russia. The population was 109 as of 2010.

== Geography ==
It is located on the Lek River.
