= Gari-ye Pain =

Gari-ye Pain گري پائين
- Village
- Location within Iran
- Coordinates: 30°25′53″N 55°16′38″E
- Country: Iran
- Province: Kerman
- County: Shahr-e Babak
- Bakhsh: Central
- Rural District: Madvarat

Population (2006)
  - Total: 27
- Time zone: UTC+3:30 (IRST)
  - Summer (DST): UTC+4:30 (IRDT)

Gari-ye Pain (Persian: گري پائين, also Romanized as Garī-ye Pā’īn; also known as Garī-ye Soflá) is a village in Madvarat Rural District, in the Central District of Shahr-e Babak County, Kerman Province, Iran. At the 2006 census, its population was 27, in 9 families.
