= Gareth Jones (computer scientist) =

British computer scientist

Gareth Jones is a computer scientist. Jones obtained a bachelor's degree in Electrical and Electronic Engineering from the University of Bristol in 1989 and a PhD examining the Application of Linguistic Models in Continuous Speech Recognition in 1994 from the same institution. He has since worked at the University of Cambridge, at the University of Exeter, at the Toshiba Corporation Research and Development Centre in Kawasaki, Japan, at Carnegie Mellon University, U.S.A. and at the National Institute of Informatics, Tokyo, Japan. In 2003 he was appointed as a Senior Lecturer in the School of Computing at Dublin City University.

Jones has published extensively in the general field of information retrieval, especially with regard to multi-medial and cross-linguistic information access, and is a member of several editorial boards.
