= Gadhi (structure) =

A Gadhi is a small castle-like structure or small fort, also known as a big wada.

The Gadhi played an important role in Indian history. In some of the Princely States, during the Raj, the Gadhi were the residences for the local Royalty.

Gadhis were used as a focal point for the governance of a region, and as such were generally in the centre of the region.

== See also ==
- Fort
- Castle
