= Garrison (disambiguation) =

A garrison is a unit of troops or its headquarters.

Garrison can also refer to:

== People ==
- Garrison (name)
- Herbert Garrison, aka Mr./Mrs. Garrison, teacher from the television program South Park
- William Lloyd Garrison, an American journalist and abolitionist

== Place names ==
Australia

- Garrison Point, Sydney

Barbados

- The Garrison (see Garrison Historic Area), a military post

Canada

- Garrison Creek (Ontario), Toronto

Northern Ireland

- Garrison, County Fermanagh, a village

United States

- Garrison Channel, Tampa, Florida
- Garrison, Iowa, a city
- Garrison, Kentucky, an unincorporated community and census-designated place
- Garrison, Maryland, a census-designated place
- Garrison Township, Crow Wing County, Minnesota
  - Garrison, Minnesota, a small city within the township
- Garrison, Missouri, an unincorporated community
- Garrison, Montana, a census-designated place
- Garrison, Nebraska, a village
- Garrison, New York, a hamlet across the Hudson River from the U.S. Military Academy at West Point
- Garrison, North Dakota, a small city
- Garrison Dam, North Dakota, directly south of the city of Garrison
- Garrison, Texas, a city
- Garrison, Utah, an unincorporated community

== Stations ==
- Garrison station (Metro-North), a train station in New York state
- Garrison station (RTD), a light rail station in Colorado

== Other uses ==
- Garrison (architecture), a type of house
- Garrison Library, Gibraltar
- Garrison Tower, Isles of Scilly
- Garrison (band), a post-hardcore band from Boston (1996–2004)
- Garrison cap, a foldable military cap
