= Gari, Gryazovetsky District, Vologda Oblast =

Gari Гари
- Village
- Location within Vologda Oblast Location within Russia
- Coordinates: 58°55′N 40°06′E
- Country: Russia
- Region: Vologda Oblast
- District: Gryazovetsky District
- Time zone: UTC+3:00

Gari (Russian: Гари) is a rural locality (a village) in Pertsevskoye Rural Settlement, Gryazovetsky District, Vologda Oblast, Russia. The population was 39 as of 2002.

== Geography ==
Gari is located 12 km (7.5 mi) northwest of Gryazovets (the district's administrative centre) by road. Knyazevo is the nearest rural locality.
