= Ghadi =

Ghadi may refer to:

- Ghadi, a judge in the two-level hierarchy of Bedouin systems of justice
- Ghadi or Ghatika, approximately 24 minutes in Hindu units of measurement
- Ghadi (film), a 2013 Lebanese film

== See also ==
- Gadi (disambiguation)
- Gadhi (disambiguation)
- Ghari (disambiguation)
- Ghara (disambiguation)
