= Gary Williams (English cricketer) =

English cricketer

Personal information
- Full name: Gary Douglas Williams
- Born: 1 September 1965 (age 61); Wolverhampton, Staffordshire, England
- Batting: Right-handed
- Bowling: Right-arm medium

Domestic team information
- Years: Team
- 2000: Worcestershire Cricket Board
- 1990–1991: Staffordshire

Career statistics
Competition	LA
Matches	2
Runs scored	13
Batting average	13.00
100s/50s	–/–
Top score	7
Balls bowled	120
Wickets	–
Bowling average	–
5 wickets in innings	–
10 wickets in match	–
Best bowling	–
Catches/stumpings	–/–
- Source: Cricinfo, 2 November 2010

Gary Douglas Williams (born 1 September 1965) is a former English cricketer. Williams was a right-handed batsman who bowled right-arm medium pace. He was born at Wolverhampton, Staffordshire.

Williams made his Minor Counties Championship debut for Staffordshire in 1990 against Cumberland. From 1990 to 1991, he represented the county in 6 Championship matches, the last of which came against Durham. Williams also represented the county in the MCCA Knockout Trophy against Oxfordshire in 1990. From 1990 to 1991, he represented the county in 3 Trophy matches, the last of which came against Oxfordshire. Williams also represented the county in a single List A match against Northamptonshire in the 1991 NatWest Trophy.

In 2000, he represented the Worcestershire Cricket Board in a single List A match against the Kent Cricket Board in the 2000 NatWest Trophy.
