= Gerri =

Gerri may refer to:

- Gerri, a feminine given name:
  - Gerri Elliott (21st century), American businesswoman
  - Gerri Green (born 1995), American football player
  - Gerri Lawlor (21st century), American actress
  - Gerri Peev (21st century), Bulgarian-British journalist
  - Gerri Russell (born 1962), American writer
  - Gerri Santoro (1935–1964), American woman who died from an illegal abortion
  - Gerri Sinclair (21st century), Canadian businesswoman
  - Gerri Whittington (1931–1993), African-American secretary
  - Gerri Willis (21st century), American journalist
- Gerri de la Sal, the administrative center of the municipality of Baix Pallars in Spain
  - Santa Maria de Gerri, a monastery in Gerri
- GERRI, a geriatric diagnostic tool

== See also ==
- Garri
- Geri (disambiguation)
- Gerrie (disambiguation)
- Gerry (disambiguation)
- Gery (disambiguation)
- Jerri (disambiguation)
