= Gari, Chernushinsky District, Perm Krai =

Gari Гари
- Village
- Location within Perm Krai Location within Russia
- Coordinates: 56°45′N 56°10′E
- Country: Russia
- Region: Perm Krai
- District: Chernushinsky District
- Time zone: UTC+5:00

Gari (Russian: Гари) is a rural locality (a village) in Chernushinsky District, Perm Krai, Russia. The population was 49 as of 2010. There are 3 streets.

== Geography ==
Gari is located 30 km north of Chernushka (the district's administrative centre) by road. Demenevo is the nearest rural locality.
