= Gari, Puchezhsky District, Ivanovo Oblast =

Gari Гари
- Village
- Location within Ivanovo Oblast Location within Russia
- Coordinates: 56°57′N 42°49′E
- Country: Russia
- Region: Ivanovo Oblast
- District: Puchezhsky District
- Time zone: UTC+3:00

Gari (Russian: Гари) is a rural locality (a village) in Puchezhsky District, Ivanovo Oblast, Russia. Population: 27 (2010 census);

== Geography ==
This rural locality is located 21 kilometres (13 mi) from Puchezh (the district's administrative centre), 113 kilometres (70 mi) from Ivanovo (capital of Ivanovo Oblast) and 343 kilometres (213 mi) from Moscow. Medvedki is the nearest rural locality.
