= Gareth Williams (rugby union, born 1988) =

- Born: Gareth Williams; 7 March 1988 (age 38) Neath, Wales
- Height: 170 cm (5 ft 7 in)
- Weight: 85 kg (13 st 5 lb)

Rugby union career
- Current team: Pontypridd RFC
Senior career
Years	Team	Apps	(Points)
2009–2010	Newport GD	? (?)	(? (?))

Gareth Williams (born 7 March 1988) is a Welsh rugby union player. A scrum-half he has represented his country from Welsh Schoolboy level through to the Under 20's. In 2008, he was a member of the Wales squad for U20 Six Nations and U20 World Cup.

Williams began his senior career with Neath. In 2008 he joined Harlequins and made his debut in the pre-season friendly against Connacht on 16 August 2008.

In December 2009, Williams joined Newport Gwent Dragons on a short-term loan arrangement from Harlequins.

Williams left the Dragons in 2011, joining Pontypridd RFC during the summer months.
