= Gary Morgan (footballer) =

English footballer

Personal information
- Full name: Gary Morgan
- Date of birth: 1 April 1961
- Place of birth: Consett, England
- Height: 5 ft 8 in (1.73 m)
- Position: Left back

Senior career*
Years	Team	Apps	(Gls)
–	Consett		
1983–1985	Berwick Rangers	67	(4)
1985–1989	Darlington	146	(3)
–	Bishop Auckland		
- * Club domestic league appearances and goals

Gary Morgan (born 1 April 1961) is an English former footballer who played in the Scottish Football League for Berwick Rangers and the Football League in England for Darlington in the 1980s. He played as a left back.

Morgan began his football career with home-town club Consett before spending two seasons playing in the Scottish Second Division for Berwick Rangers. In 1985, he returned to England to join Football League Third Division club Darlington for a £10,000 fee. During his four years with the club they were relegated twice. He left after the second relegation, that took the club into the Conference. He later played non-league football for Bishop Auckland.
