= Jerri Mumford =

British-born Canadian World War II servicewoman

Minnie Mumford
- Nickname: Jerri
- Born: January 4, 1909; Devon, England
- Died: August 28, 2002 (aged 93)
- Allegiance: Canada
- Branch: Army
- Rank: Commandant (Halifax Women's Service Corps), Private (Canadian Women's Army Corps)
- Awards: 1939–1945 Star, Italy Star, Defence medal, Canadian Forces' Decoration

Minnie "Jerri" Mumford (1909–2002) was a British-born Canadian World War II servicewoman. After serving as Commandant of the Halifax Women's Service Corps, an early Atlantic Canadian women's army corps, Mumford subsequently joined the Canadian Women's Army Corps (CWAC). She served overseas for three years, and was one of the only CWAC members chosen to accompany the invading Allied forces to Italy in 1944.

== Early life ==
Mumford was born January 4, 1909, in Devon, England. In 1930, Mumford immigrated to Canada and began working as a governess, teaching the children of a naval lieutenant.

== Career ==
In 1938, Mumford began to be interested in the idea of forming a women's army corps. Two years later she became Commandant of the Halifax Women's Service Corps, an early Atlantic Canadian predecessor to the Canadian Women's Army Corps (CWAC). The Halifax Women's Service Corps was organized much like the Auxiliary Territorial Service. Mumford was in charge of over 250 women members. On Armistice Day, 1940, Mumford's Halifax Corps marched in uniform to the cenotaph in Halifax Grand Parade, the first time a group of women had ever participated in the service this way.

When CWAC was established in 1941, Mumford left Halifax and travelled west to enlist in the new corps as a private. She was sent to England aboard the Queen Elizabeth I, and for two years Mumford worked at the office of the Judge Advocate General at Canadian Military headquarters. As the bombing raids hit London, Mumford also headed a barracks fire team, and was responsible for directing fire hoses at the buildings that were worst damaged.

In 1944, Mumford was transferred to a ship destined for Italy. When she reached Gibraltar along the way, her convoy was attacked by German U-boats, and she saw a Canadian medical ship torpedoed and sunk. Upon arriving at their destination, Mumford was one of only 11 CWACs chosen to go into Italy with the invading forces; she evacuated wounded soldiers, sometimes going days without sleep. She remained in Italy until 1945, when the CWACs were recalled to England.

She took part in the Victory Parade in London at the end of the war.

After being discharged and returning to Canada, Mumford settled in Victoria, British Columbia. She worked with the Department of Veterans Affairs and National Defence at Royal Roads and CFB Esquimalt, and joined the 5th Field Battery of the Victoria Militia, remaining with the militia until her retirement 15 years later.

Mumford was a member of Branch 182 of the Royal Canadian Legion for the rest of her life.

== Honours ==
Mumford was a recipient of the 1939–1945 Star, the Italy Star, the Defence Medal, and the Canadian Forces' Decoration.

== Death ==
Mumford died on August 28, 2002.
