= Gari, Permsky District, Perm Krai =

Gari Гари
- Village
- Location within Perm Krai Location within Russia
- Coordinates: 58°14′N 56°19′E
- Country: Russia
- Region: Perm Krai
- District: Permsky District
- Time zone: UTC+5:00

Gari (Russian: Гари) is a rural locality (a village) in Khokhlovskoye Rural Settlement, Permsky District, Perm Krai, Russia. The population was 2 as of 2010. There are 2 streets.

== Geography ==
Gari is located 45 km north of Perm (the district's administrative centre) by road. Karasye is the nearest rural locality.
