= Garí =

Garí is a surname of Catalan and Balearic origin.

People with the surname include:

- Abbot Garí, 10th century Benedictine abbot
- Bernat Vidal Garí (1844–1930), Mallorcan glosador
- Francesc Garí Mir (1939–2009), Mallorcan politician
- Jaume Garí i Poch (fl. 20th century), Catalan discoverer of the Cuevas de la Araña
- Joan Garí (born 1965), Spanish writer and professor
- Joan Garí, 9th-century legendary friar
- Joan Melià i Garí (born 1954), Mallorcan philologist
- Josep Anton Garí i Siumell (1812–1895), Mercedarian priest
- Josep Garí i Cañas (1855–1925), Catalan banker
- Josep Garí i Gimeno (1886–1965), Catalan banker
- Llorenç Capellà Garí (1882–1950), Mallorcan glosador
- Lluís Bonet i Garí (1893–1993), Catalan architect
- Mateo Nicolau Garí (1920–2005), Mexican footballer
- Onofre Garí i Torrent (1872–1920), Catalan-American painter
- Rafael Garí Net (1910–1999), Argentina footballer
- Roberto de Robert y Garí, Marquess of Serralavega since 2018
- Enrique Sacerio-Garí (born 1945), Cuban-American author and professor

== See also ==
- Arnús-Garí Joint Stock Company
- Cal Garí, 19th-century Catalan building
- Can Garí, 20th-century building in Tiana
- Casa Garí, historical house in Argentona
- Garin (surname), the Spanish equivalent
- Mount Garí
