= Gaddis (surname) =

Gaddis is a surname. Notable people with the surname include:

- C. J. Gaddis (born 1985), America football player
- Christian Gaddis (born 1984), American football player
- Gadabout Gaddis (1896-1986), American television fisherman
- Hunter Gaddis (born 1998), American baseball player
- John Lewis Gaddis (born 1941), American historian of the Cold War
- Miranda Gaddis, American crime victim
- Thomas E. Gaddis (1908–1984), American author
- Vincent Gaddis (1913–1997), American author
- William Gaddis (1922-1998), American novelist

== See also ==
- Gaddis Smith (1932-2022), American historian
