= Gaddi Torso =

Classical Greek sculpture of a torso

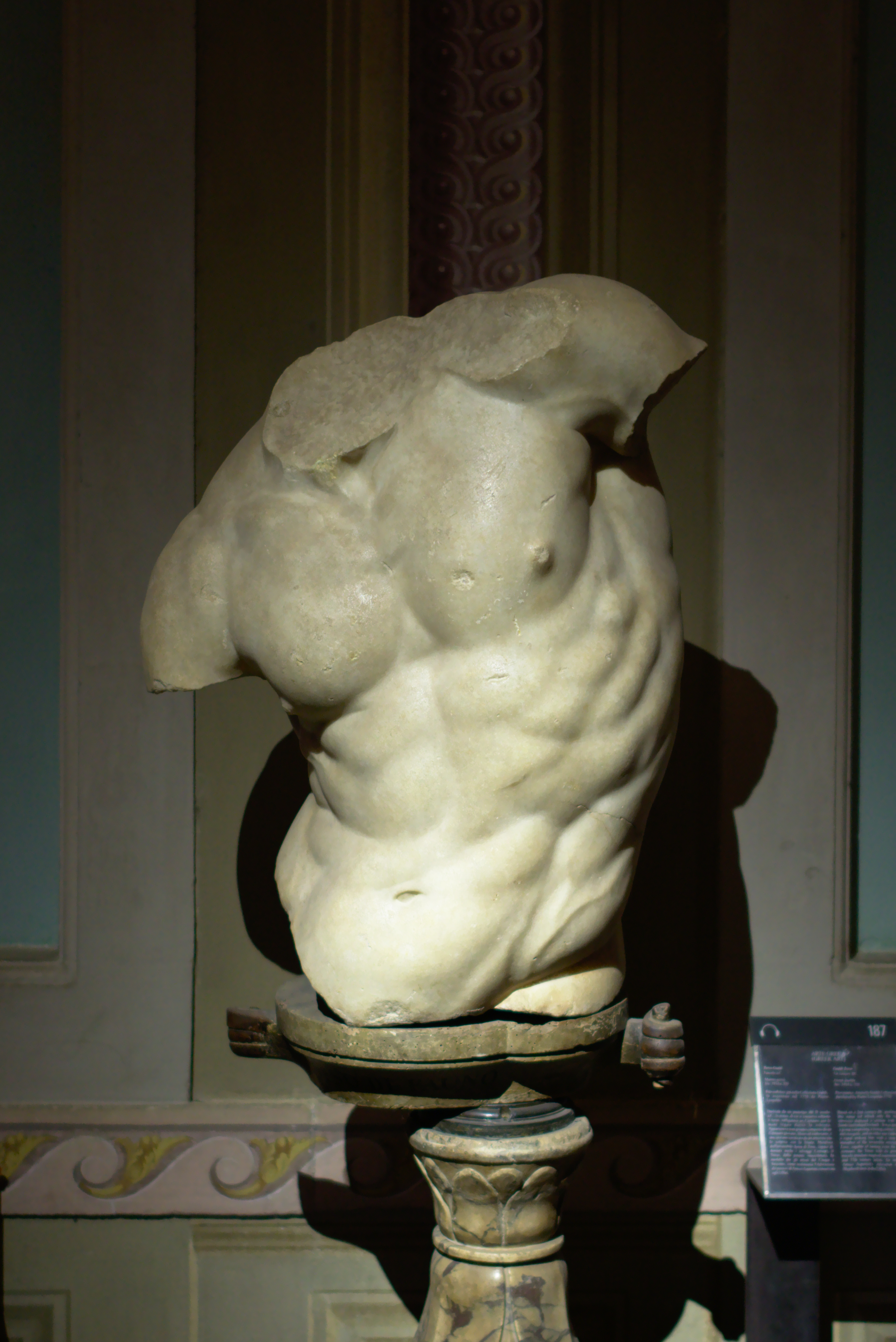
Gaddi Torso as seen in Uffizi Gallery

The marble Gaddi Torso displayed in the Classical Sculpture Room of the Uffizi, Florence, is a Hellenistic sculpture of the 2nd century BCE.

== Description ==
Its dynamic tension and unusually refined modelling place it among sculptures of the Pergamene school.

Formerly considered to be the torso of a satyr when it was in the Gaddi collection, Florence, the sculpture is now thought to represent a centaur straining against his bonds, a theme that was represented several times in Hellenistic art, as it was an emblem of civilized control of Man's baser nature. The torso was very likely discovered in Rome, according to Giovanni Di Pasquale and Fabrizio Paolucci. It was certainly already in the collections of the Florentine Gaddi family in the early 16th century, when Florentine artists and sculptors knew it. The sculpture appears on a pedestal, among other vestiges of shattered Classical pagan culture, in the Adoration of the Shepherds that was painted in 1515 by the Bolognese painter Amico Aspertini, now in the Uffizi. Rosso Fiorentino's Deposition of the Dead Christ (Boston Museum of Fine Arts) has been inspired by careful study of the Gaddi Torso. Its powerful, reaching and twisting musculature was a stimulus also to the young Michelangelo, whose mature style the Gaddi Torso seems to anticipate. The Gaddi Torso remained with the Gaddi heirs until it was sold, still in its untouched fragmentary condition, to Leopold I, Grand Duke of Tuscany in 1778.

In its earlier history the Gaddi Torso may have been in the collection of the great early Renaissance sculptor of Florence, Lorenzo Ghiberti, "who", according to Giorgio Vasari:

to say nothing of his own performance, bequeathed many relics of antiquity to his family, some in marble, others in bronze. Among these was the bed of Polycretus which was a most rare thing; a leg of bronze, of the size of life, with certain heads, male and female, and some vases, which Lorenzo had caused to be brought from Greece at no small cost. He also left the torsi of many figures, with a great number of similar things, which were all dispersed, like the property of Lorenzo, suffered to be destroyed and squandered. Some of these antiquities were sold to Messer Giovanni Gaddi, then 'Cherico di Camera'; and among them was the aforesaid bed of Polycletus, and some other matters, which formed the better part of the collection.

In company with the Belvedere Torso in the Vatican collections, the Gaddi Torso was never restored by being completed, a fate undergone by most other fine Antique fragmentary sculpture.
