= Jerrie =

Jerrie is a feminine given name. Notable people with the name include:

- Jerrie Cobb (1931–2019), American aviator
- Jerrie Mock (1925–2014), American aviator
