= Garaidh =

Male given name

- Gender: Male

Origin
- Region of origin: Scotland, Ireland

Garaidh (Scottish Gaelic pronunciation: [ˈkaɾɪ]) is a Scottish Gaelic and Irish Gaelic masculine given name of uncertain derivation but as a name occurs frequently in Middle and Old Irish texts (in its Old Irish form Garaid), for example in the 13th century Acallam na Senórach: Donn mac Aeda, mheic Garaid, meic Morna 'Don son of Aodh, son of Garaidh, son of Morna'.

Garaidh is commonly rendered in English as Gary. It is also commonly (esp. in Scotland) spelled Garry. However, the name Gary is of Germanic origin (from gar meaning 'spear').

Although visually similar, most occurrences of -gar(r)y in place-names are unrelated to the name. In place-names, -gar(r)y is usually derived from one of the following elements:

- Old Norse gerði, originally meaning enclosure but later on land around a dwelling, pasture, e.g. Geàrraidh na h-Aibhne Garynahine
- a hydronymic element (usually a river name) e.g. Gleann Garadh/Gharadh Glen Garry, Inbhir Gharadh/Garraidh Invergarry
