= Gharry =

Horse-drawn cab used especially in India

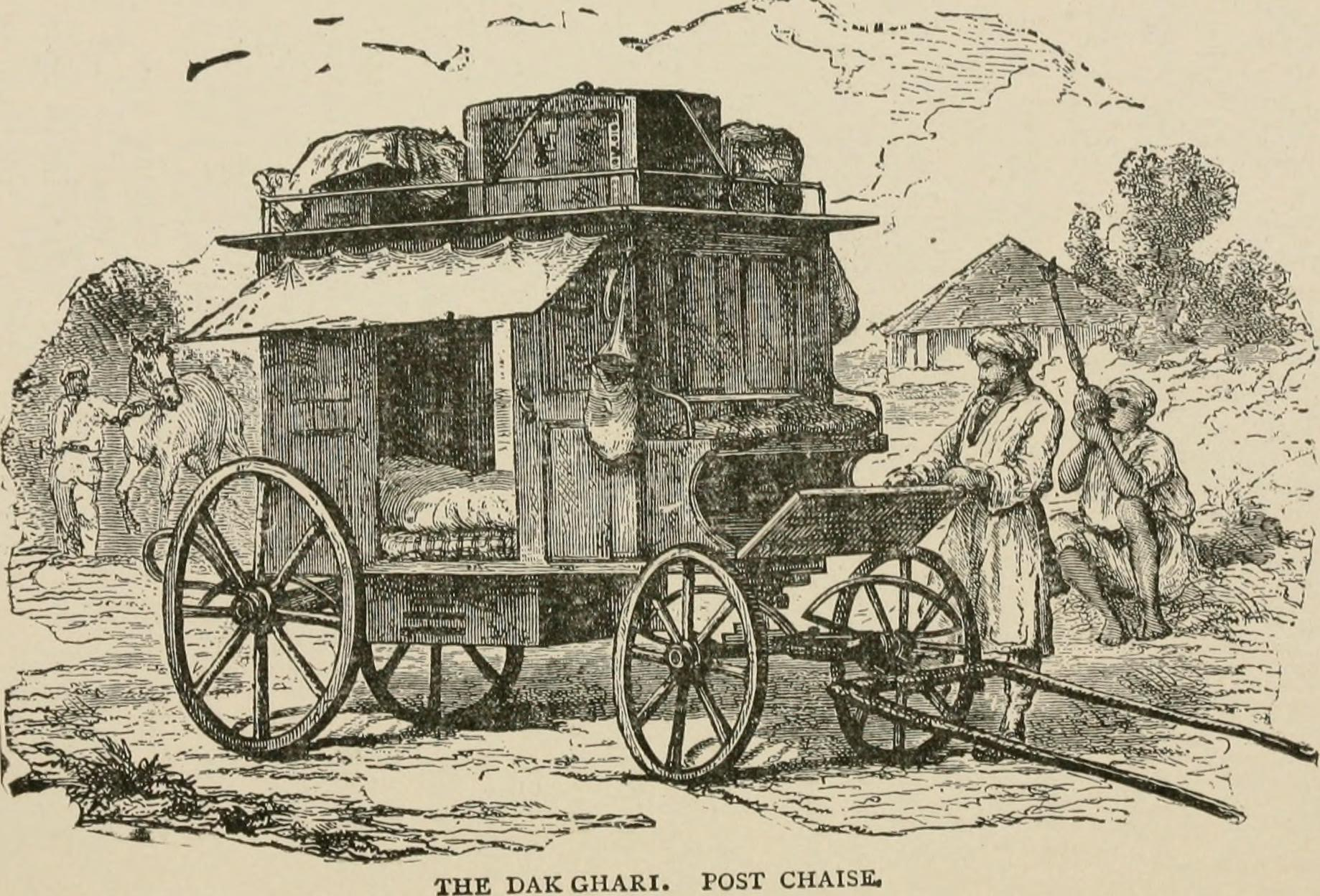
A gharry (1890s)

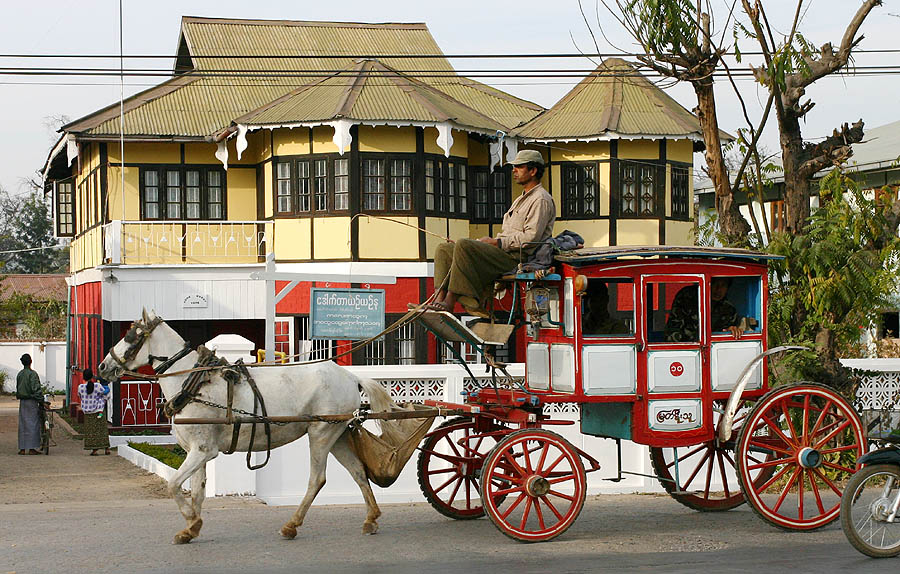
A modern gharry (2004)

A gharry or palkigari is a four-wheel horse-drawn carriage of India used as a hackney carriage (carriage for public hire). It has been spelled gharri, gari, garry, and other variations. The driver is called a gharry-wallah.

== Design ==
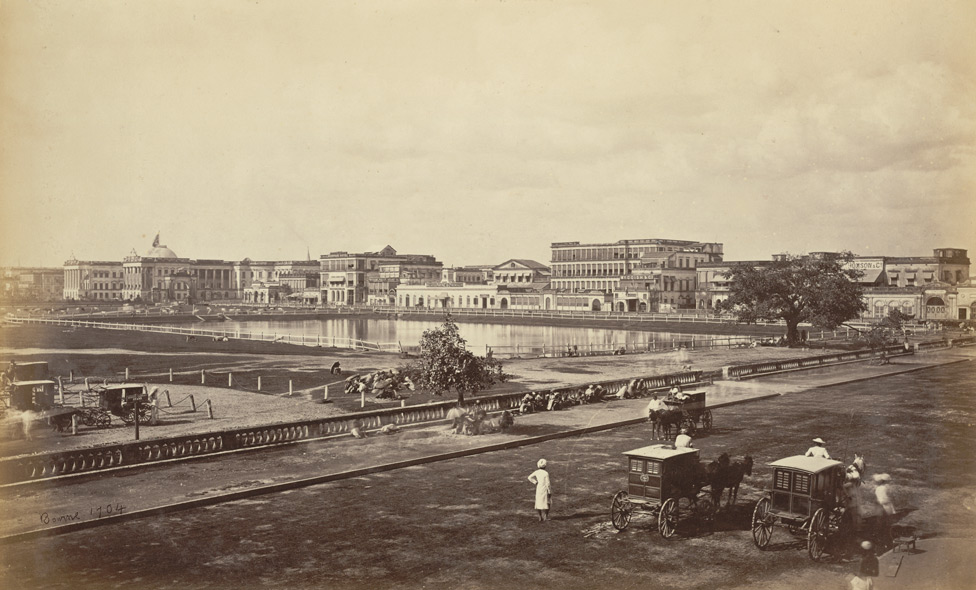
The two gharry in the foreground illustrate the slatted blinds (1865)

The gharry has four-wheels, is pulled by one or two horses, and has an elevated driver seat in front of the body. It is shaped somewhat like a sedan chair on wheels. It traditionally had sliding door panels on the sides for entry, and slatted blinds over window openings to allow ventilation while excluding the sun — though for contemporary tourist sightseeing the doors have been replaced with hinged doors and the blinds omitted. Passengers sit inside, face to face, one seat facing forward and the other backward. The gap of its double roof provides a ventilated cavity for buffering the sun's heat.

== Historical context ==
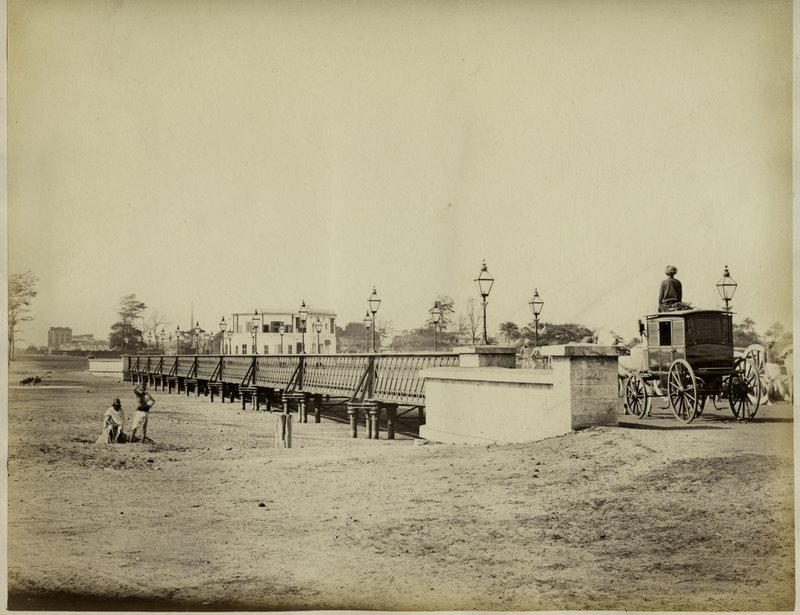
Palkigari in British India (circa 1870)

The word gharry has been spelled gharri, gari, garry and other variations from the romanization of words from languages of India including Hindi: गाड़ी, gāṛī and Urdu: گاڑی — meaning cart or carriage, and now also car or truck. Gari is an ellipsis (shortening) of palkigari, meaning a carriage shaped like a palanquin (litter).

A fleet of palkigaris were maintained along the main post roads of British India from the 1840s.

== See also ==
- Transport in India
