= Gerard =

- Pronunciation: UK: /ˈdʒɛrɑːrd/ JERR-ard, US: /dʒəˈrɑːrd/ jə-RARD; French: [ʒeʁaʁ] Old French: [dʒerɑrd]
- Gender: male

Origin
- Origin: Germanic
- Meaning: "strong spear"
- Region of origin: common in regions where Germanic and/or Romance languages are spoken

Other names
- Related names: Gérard, Gerardo, Gerald, Gerd, Gerhard, Gerhardt, Gerhardus, Gerrit, Gerry, Geert, Gert, Gertje, Gherardo, Girard, Guérard, Jerry, Garrett

Gerard is a masculine forename of Proto-Germanic origin, variations of which exist in many Germanic and Romance languages. Like many other early Germanic names, it is dithematic, consisting of two meaningful constituents put together. In this case, those constituents are gari > ger- (meaning 'spear') and -hard (meaning 'hard/strong/brave').

Common forms of the name are Gerard (English, Scottish, Irish, Dutch, Polish and Catalan); Gerrard (English, Scottish, Irish); Gerardo (Italian, and Spanish); Geraldo (Portuguese); Gherardo (Italian); Gherardi (Northern Italian, now only a surname); Gérard (variant forms Girard and Guérard, now only surnames, French); Gearóid (Irish); Gerhardt and Gerhart/Gerhard/Gerhardus (German, Dutch, and Afrikaans); Gellért (Hungarian); Gerardas (Lithuanian) and Gerards/Ģirts (Latvian); Γεράρδης (Greece). A few abbreviated forms are Gerry and Jerry (English); Gerd (German) and Gert (Afrikaans and Dutch); Gerrit (Afrikaans and Dutch); Gertjie (Afrikaans); Geert (Dutch) and Жоро (Bulgarian).

The introduction of the name 'Gerard' into the English language took place following the Norman conquest of England in 1066. Its original forms in Old French were "Gerard, Gerart" and "Girart".

Patronymic surnames derived from a form of Gerard include Garrard, Garritsen, Gerard, Geertsen, Gerardet, Gerardi, Gerdes, Gerrard, Gerretsen, Gerrits(e), Gerritsen, Ghiraldi, and Giraud.

The name Gerald, while phonetically similar to Gerard, derives from a slightly different set of constituents: ger and wald (meaning 'rule/lead').

== First name ==
=== Academics ===
- Gerard A. Alphonse, Haitian electrical engineer
- Gerard Bolland (1854–1922), Dutch philosopher and radical
- Gerard Clauson (1891–1974), English Orientalist
- Gerard of Cremona (1114–1187), Italian translator of scientific Arabic works
- Gerard De Geer (1858–1943), Swedish geologist
- Gerard Heymans (1857–1930), Dutch philosopher and psychologist
- Gerard Hendrik Hofstede (1928–2020), Dutch social psychologist
- Gerard 't Hooft (born 1946), Dutch theoretical physicist
- Gerard de Jode (1509–1591), Dutch cartographer, engraver and publisher
- Gerard Krefft (1830–1881), Australian zoologist
- Gerard de Kremer (1512–1594), Flemish cartographer, geographer and cosmographer
- Gerard Kuiper (1905–1973), Dutch–American astronomer
- Gerard Labuda (1916–2010), Polish historian
- Gerard van der Leeuw (1890–1950), Dutch historian and philosopher of religion
- Gerard Luttikhuizen (born 1940), Dutch scholar of religion and early Christianity
- Gerard K. O'Neill (1927–1992), American physicist and space activist
- Gerard Salton (1927–1995), German–born American computer scientist
- Gerard van Swieten (1700–1772), Dutch–Austrian physician

=== Arts ===
==== Music ====
- Gerardo Emanuel Flores (born 1981), singer-songwriter and producer
- Gerard Joling (born 1960), Dutch pop singer
- Gerard Mortier (1943–2014), Belgian opera director and administrator
- Gerard Nolan (1946–1992), American rock drummer
- Gerard Schwarz (born 1947), American conductor
- Gerard Way (born 1977), American singer-songwriter and comic book writer

==== Theater and film ====
- Gerard Montgomery Bluefeather (1887–1963), American movie actor known as "Monte Blue"
- Gerard Butler (born 1969), Scottish actor
- Gerard Damiano (1928–2008), American director of adult films
- Gerard Depardieu (born 1948), French actor, filmmaker, and vineyard owner
- Gerard Kennedy (actor) (1932–2025), Australian actor
- Gerard Marenghi (1920–2018), American actor
- Gerard McCarthy (born 1981), Northern Irish actor
- Gerard McSorley (born 1950), Irish actor
- Gerard Murphy (Irish actor) (1948–2013), Northern Irish actor
- Gerard Kenneth Tierney (1924–1985), American TV and western actor known as Scott Brady

==== Visual arts ====
- Gerard Bilders (1838–1865), Dutch painter and art collector
- Gerard ter Borch (1617–1681), Dutch painter
- Gerard David (1460–1523), Dutch painter
- Gerard Dou (1613–1675), Dutch genre painter
- Gerard Douffet (1594–1660), Flemish painter
- Gerard Edelinck (1640–1707), Flemish–born French engraver
- Gerard Hoet (1648–1733), Dutch painter and engraver
- Gerard van Honthorst (1592–1656), Dutch painter
- Gerard Horenbout (c. 1465–c. 1541), Flemish miniaturist a.k.a. the Master of James IV of Scotland
- Gerard Houckgeest (c. 1600–1661), Dutch architectural and church interior painter
- Gerard de Lairesse (1641–1711), Dutch painter and art theorist
- Gerard Moerdijk (1890–1958), South African architect
- Gerard Thomas Rietveld (1888–1964), Dutch furniture designer and architect
- Gerard Seghers (1591–1651), Flemish painter, art collector, and art dealer
- Gerard van Spaendonck (1746–1822), Dutch floral painter

==== Writing ====
- Gerard F. Conway (born 1952), American writer of comic books and television shows
- Gerard Manley Hopkins (1844–1889), British poet
- Gerard Malanga (born 1943), American poet, photographer, filmmaker, curator and archivist
- Gérard de Nerval (1808–1855), nom-de-plume of French writer, poet, and translator Gérard Labrunie
- Gerard Reve (1923–2006), Dutch writer
- Gerard Soeteman (1936–2025), Dutch screenwriter and comics writer
- Gerard Walschap (1898–1989), Belgian writer

=== Business ===
- Gerard Adriaan Heineken (1841–1893), Dutch founder of Heineken beer
- Gerard Kleisterlee (born 1946), Dutch business executive, CEO of Philips
- Gerard Philips (1858–1942), Dutch co–founder of "Philips"
- Gerard Reynst (1560s–1615), Dutch merchant and Governor–General of the Dutch East Indies

=== Crime ===
- Gerard Conlon (1954–2014), wrongfully imprisoned Northern Irishman, subject of "In the Name of the Father,"
- Gerard John Schaefer (1946–1995), American serial killer
- Gerard Mahon, part of a married Irish couple who with wife was murdered in Twinbrook, Belfast

=== Medieval rulers ===
- Gerard I of Paris (died 779), count of Paris
- Gerard, Count of Auvergne (died 841), son of Pepin I
- Gerhard I of Metz (c. 875–910), count of Metz
- Gerard, Duke of Lorraine (c. 1030–1070), Lotharingian nobleman
- Gerard Grenier (died c. 1170), Lord of Sidon, Kingdom of Jerusalem
- Gerard I, Count of Guelders (c. 1060–1120)
- Gerard II, Count of Guelders (died 1131)
- Gerard, Count of Loon (died 1191)
- Gerard, Count of Rieneck (died 1216), son of Gerard, Count of Loon
- Gerard III, Count of Guelders (1185–1229)
- Gerhard III, Count of Holstein-Rendsburg (died 1340)

=== Military ===
- Gerard Bucknall (1894–1980), British army general
- Gerard Pietersz Hulft (1621–1656), Dutch general
- Gerard Lake, 1st Viscount Lake (1744–1808), British general
- Gerard de Ridefort (died 1189), Flemish Grand Master of the Knights Templar

=== Politics ===
- Gerard Adams (born 1948), Irish politician, leader of the Sinn Feín party
- Gerard Batliner (1928–2008), Prime Minister of Liechtenstein
- Gerard Batten (born 1954), English UKIP politician
- Gerard Anthony Brownlee (born 1956), New Zealand government minister
- Gerard Collier, 5th Baron Monkswell (1947–2020), British politician
- Gerard Cooreman (1852–1926), Belgian Prime Minister
- Gerard MacBryan (1902–1953), British civil servant and private secretary
- Gerard Wijeyekoon (1878–1952), Sri Lankan Sinhala lawyer and politician, first President of the Senate of Ceylon

=== Religion ===
- Gerard, Abbot of Brogne (c. 895–959), Belgian abbot and saint
- Gerard of Toul (935–994), German bishop and saint
- Gerard of Csanád (died 1046), Hungarian bishop and saint, a.k.a. Gerard Sagredo
- Gerard of Florennes (c. 975–1051), Bishop of Cambrai
- Gerard of Burgundy (died 1061), known as Pope Nicholas II
- Gerard (archbishop of York) (died 1108), English archbishop
- Blessed Gerard (c. 1040–1120), Benedictine founder of the Knights Hospitaller
- Gerard Segarelli (c. 1240–1309), Italian founder of the Apostolic Brethren
- Gérard de Dainville (died 1378), Bishop of Cambrai
- Gerard Groote (1340–1384), Dutch founder of the Brethren of the Common Life
- Gerard van Groesbeeck (1517–1580), Flemish bishop and cardinal
- Gerard Majella (1726–1755), Italian lay brother and saint
- Gerard de Korte (born 1955), Dutch Roman Catholic bishop

=== Sports ===
- Gerard Cieślik (1927–2013), Polish football striker
- Gerard Deulofeu (born 1994), Spanish football forward
- Gerard Kemkers (born 1967), Dutch speed skater and skating coach
- Gerard Friedrich Knetemann (1951–2004), Dutch racing cyclist
- Gerard López (born 1979), Spanish football midfielder
- Gerard Moreno (born 1992), Spanish football striker
- Gerard Murphy (Australian sports consultant)
- Gerard Nijboer (born 1955), Dutch long–distance runner
- Gerard Piqué (born 1987), Spanish football defender
- Gerard Plessers (born 1959), Belgian football defender
- Gerard de Rooy (born 1980), Dutch truck racer
- Gerard van Velde (born 1971), Dutch speed skater and skating coach

== Last name ==
- Gerard (surname)

== Fictional characters ==
- Prince Gerard Himerce, the main hero of Gaiapolis
- Brigadier Gerard in the novel Uncle Bernac and the short story anthologies The Adventures of Gerard and The Exploits of Brigadier Gerard, by Arthur Conan Doyle
- Joe Gerard, husband of the title character in the 1970s television series Rhoda
- Philip Gerard, pursuer of the title character in the television series The Fugitive
- Samuel Gerard, in the films The Fugitive and U.S. Marshals
- Gerard DuGalle, in the video game StarCraft: Brood War
- Gerard Duval, in the 1929 novel All Quiet on the Western Front by Erich Maria Remarque
- Gérard, in the Chronicles of Amber novel series by Roger Zelazny
- Gerard Argent, a werewolf hunter and antagonist in MTV's cult television show Teen Wolf.
- Marcel Gerard, a vampire and ruler of the New Orleans supernatural community in The CW network's television series The Originals.
- Gerard Valkyrie is a Quincy and a member of the Wandenreich's Sternritter with the designation "M" - The Miracle from the Bleach manga

== See also ==
- Gérard
- Gerhard
- Gerhardt
- Gerad (disambiguation)
- Gerhart
- Gerald (disambiguation)
- Gerrard (disambiguation)
- Girard (disambiguation)
- Guerard (disambiguation)
- Saint Gerard (disambiguation)
