= Gerritsz =

Gerritsz is a German and Dutch patronymic surname, a variant of Gerrits; it is an abbreviation of Gerritszoon, a Dutch patronymic literally meaning "son of Gerrit". Notable people with the name include:

- Quiringh Gerritsz. van Brekelenkam (1622–1669), Dutch Baroque genre painter
- Jan Gerritsz van Bronckhorst (1603–1661), Dutch Golden Age painter and engraver
- Benjamin Gerritsz Cuyp (1612–1652), Dutch Golden Age landscape painter
- Eugen Gerritz (1935–2024), German politician
- Gerrit Gerritsz Cuyp (1565–1644), Dutch Golden Age painter and stained glass cartoon draughtsman
- Jacob Gerritsz. Cuyp (also spelt Cuijp) (1594–1652), portrait and landscape painter, best known for his portraits
- Cornelis Gerritsz Decker (1618–1678), Dutch Golden Age landscape painter
- Gerrit Gerritsz (1465–1495), early Netherlandish painter from the northern Low Countries in the Holy Roman Empire
- Hessel Gerritsz (1581–1632), Dutch engraver, cartographer, and publisher
- Jacob Gerritsz. Loef (1605–1683), Dutch Golden Age marine painter
- Dirck Gerritsz Pomp (1544–1608), Dutch sailor of the 16th–17th century, and the first known Dutchman to visit China and Japan
- Hendrik Gerritsz Pot (1580–1657), Dutch Golden Age painter, officer of the militia
- Pieter Gerritsz van Roestraten (1630–1700), Dutch Golden Age painter of still lifes and genre scenes
- Floris Gerritsz. van Schooten (1585–1656), Dutch painter of still life
- Maarten Gerritsz Vries (1589–1647), 17th-century Dutch cartographer and explorer
- Adriaan Gerritsz de Vrije (1570–1643), Dutch Golden Age glass painter

== See also ==
- Gerritsz Bay, the 4 km wide bay on the north coast of Anvers Island in the Palmer Archipelago, Antarctica
- Gritz (disambiguation)
