= Gerardo =

- Pronunciation: Her-ar-doh
- Gender: Male

Origin
- Origin: Germanic
- Meaning: strong spear

Other names
- Related names: Geraldo, Gerard, Gerald, Gerhardt

Gerardo is the Spanish, Portuguese and Italian form of the male given name Gerard. It may refer to:

- Gerardo Amarilla (born 1969), Uruguayan politician
- Gerardo Bonilla (born 1975), Puerto Rican-born professional race car driver
- Gerardo Carrera Piñera (born 1987), Spanish professional footballer, usually simply Gerardo
- Gerardo Chávez (1937–2025), Peruvian painter, sculptor and visual artist
- Gerardo Diego (1896–1987), Spanish poet
- Gerardo García León (born 1974), Spanish footballer
- Gerardo Greco (born 1966), Italian journalist
- Gerardo Guevara (1930–2024), Ecuadorian composer
- Gerardo Herrero (born 1953), Spanish film director, screenwriter and producer
- Gerardo Jauri (born 1961), Uruguayan basketball coach
- Gerardo de León (1913–1981), Filipino actor and film director
- Gerardo Lopez (disambiguation), several people
- Gerardo Machado (1871–1939), President of Cuba
- Gerardo Martino (born 1962), retired Argentine footballer and current manager
- Gerardo Matos Rodríguez (1897–1948), Uruguayan musician, composer and journalist
- Gerardo Mejía (born 1965), Ecuadorian-born musician, known as Gerardo
- Gerardo Meléndez, Puerto Rico-born scientist
- Gerardo Milman (born 1966), Argentine politician
- Gerardo Miranda (born 1956), retired Spanish footballer, usually simply Gerardo
- Gerardo Parra (born 1987), Venezuelan professional baseball player
- Gerardo Roxas (1924–1982), Filipino senator
- Gerardo Sofovich (1937–2015), Argentine businessman
- Gerardo Torrado (born 1979), Mexican footballer

== See also ==
- Geraldo
- Lalo (nickname)
- Gerard
