= São Geraldo =

São Geraldo is the Portuguese word for "Saint Gerald". It may refer to:

== Places ==
Brazil

- São Geraldo, Minas Gerais
- São Geraldo, Porto Alegre, Rio Grande do Sul
- São Geraldo da Piedade, Minas Gerais
- São Geraldo do Araguaia, Pará
- São Geraldo do Baixio, Minas Gerais
