= Gerhardt =

Gerhardt is a masculine name of German origin. It can refer to the following:

== As a first name ==
- Ants Eskola (1908–1989), Soviet-Estonian actor and singer born Gerhardt Esperk
- Gerhardt Knodel (born 1940), American textile artist, educator
- Gerhardt Laves (1906–1993), American linguist
- Gerhardt Neef (1946–2010), German footballer

== As a surname ==
- Alban Gerhardt (born 1969), German cellist
- Anna Gerhardt (born 1998), German association football player
- Carl Jakob Adolf Christian Gerhardt (1833–1902), German internist
- Charles Gerhardt (conductor) (1927–1999), American conductor
- Charles Frédéric Gerhardt (1816–1856), French chemist
- Charles H. Gerhardt (1895–1976), American general
- Dieter Gerhardt (born 1935), commodore in the South African Navy and Soviet spy
- Elena Gerhardt (1883–1961), German singer
- Hans-Jürgen Gerhardt (born 1954), East German bobsledder
- Ida Gerhardt (1905–1997), Dutch poet
- Joe Gerhardt (1855–1922), Major League Baseball player
- Joseph Gerhardt (1817–1881), Union Army brigadier general during the American Civil War
- Julius Gerhardt (1827–1912), Silesian teacher, entomologist and botanist
- Nyema Gerhardt (born 1985), Swiss-born Liberian footballer
- Paul Gerhardt
- Bob Gerhardt (1903–1989), American rower
- Sue Gerhardt (born 1953), British psychoanalytic psychotherapist
- Teena Gerhardt (born 1980), American mathematician
- Tom Gerhardt (born 1957), German actor and comedian
- Yannick Gerhardt (born 1994), German association football player
- Wolfgang Gerhardt (1943–2024), German politician

== Fictional characters ==
- The title heroine of the 1911 novel Jennie Gerhardt by Theodore Dreiser
- Mack Gerhardt and Tiffy Gerhardt, in the American TV series The Unit
- The Gerhardt crime family, in the American TV series Fargo
- The inventor of the magical economic system in Max Gladstone's Craft Sequence
- Gerhardt Frankenstein, brother of Dr. Victor Frankenstein in the ABC fantasy series Once Upon A Time
- Gerhardt Sock, president of the Butchers' Guild in Ankh-Morpork, most notably in Feet of Clay by Terry Pratchett (GNU Terry Pratchett)

== See also ==
- Gerhard
- Gerhart (disambiguation)
- Gérard
