= Marcílio Dias, Porto Alegre =

Coordinates: 26°08′S 50°23′W

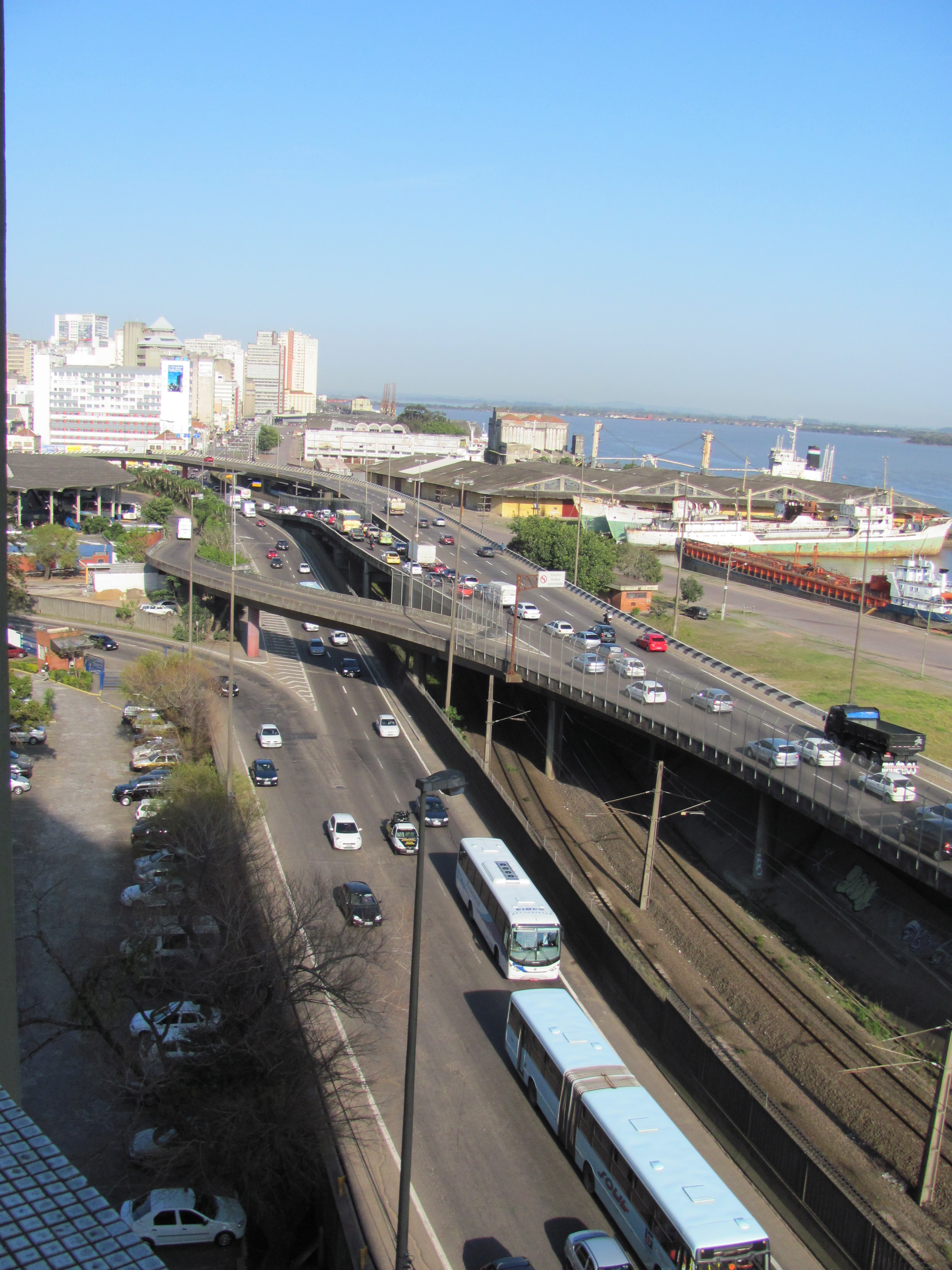
View of the border between Marcílio Dias and the Centro Histórico.

Marcílio Dias is a neighbourhood (bairro) in the city of Porto Alegre, the state capital of Rio Grande do Sul, in Brazil. It was created by Law 2022 from December 7, 1959, but had its limits modified by Law 6218 from October 17, 1988, which originated the Farrapos and Humaitá neighbourhoods.

It was named after Marcílio Dias (1838-1865), a sailor man and war hero during the Paraguayan War.

Territorially, Marcílio Dias is a narrow and long strip on the bank of Guaíba Lake, being bounded by the Centro Histórico (Historic Centre) and the Farrapos, Navegantes, São Geraldo and Floresta neighbourhoods.

The Port of Porto Alegre is located here, as well as the Guaíba Bridge and the Secretaria de Segurança Pública (Public Security Bureau).

In 2000, there were 598 people living in Marcílio Dias.
