= Gerritszoon =

Gerritzoon, Gerritszoon is a Dutch patronymic surname or patronymic literally meaning "son of Gerrit", sometimes abbreviated to Gerritz. or Gerritsz.. Notable people with the name include:

- Adriaan Gerritsz de Vrije
- Benjamin Gerritsz. Cuyp
- Claes Gerritszoon Compaen
- Cornelis Gerritsz Decker
- Dirck Gerritsz Pomp
- Jacob Gerritsz. Cuyp
- Jacob Gerritsz. Loef
- Jan Gerritsz van Bronckhorst
- Floris Gerritsz. van Schooten
- Gerrit Gerritszoon
- Gerrit Gerritsz. Cuyp
- Gerrit Gerritsz
- Hendrik Gerritsz Pot
- Hessel Gerritszoon or Hessel Gerritsz
- Maarten Gerritszoon Vries
- Maarten de Niet Gerritzoon
- Pieter Gerritsz van Roestraten
- Quiringh Gerritsz van Brekelenkam

== See also ==
- Gerritsen
