= Gerrard =

Gerrard may refer to:

== People ==
- Gerrard (surname)

== Places ==
- Gerrards Cross, a town in Buckinghamshire
- Gerrard, Colorado, Rio Grande County, Colorado
- Gerrard, British Columbia, a ghost town

== See also ==
- Gerrard Street (disambiguation), a street name in two cities
- Gerrards Cross, Buckinghamshire, England
- Gerard, a name
