= St Gerard's =

St Gerard's can apply to a number of things/places etc.

- Something belonging to a Saint Gerard
- St. Gerard Majella Catholic Church in Carlingford, Sydney, Australia
- St Gerard's Church and Monastery in Wellington, New Zealand
- St Gerard's School in Bray, Ireland
- St. Gerard School, Saskatoon
- St. Gerard Catholic High School in San Antonio, Texas
- St. Gerard's RC Secondary, Govan in Glasgow, United Kingdom
