= Paul Gerhardt (disambiguation) =

Paul Gerhardt may refer to:

- Paul Gerhardt (1607–1676), German theologian
- Paul Gerhardt (athlete) (1901–1956), German long-distance runner
- Paul Gerhardt Sr. (1863–1951), American architect
- Paul Gerhardt Jr. (1899–1966), American architect
