= Gerdes =

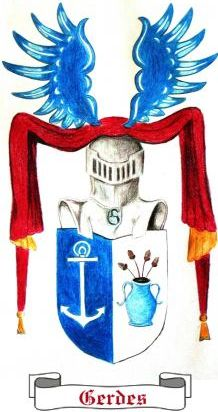
A coat of arms of a Gerdes family; since there is no single origin, other coat of arms of the Gerdes families exist.

Gerdes or Geerdes (/ˈɡɛərdɪs/ GAIR-diss, German: [ˈɡeːɐ̯dəs]) is a surname of German origin. It is a patronymic name, i.e. it comes from "son of Gerhard". When around 1800 the Prussian government under French occupation decided to fix the surnames, the contemporary "son of Gerhard" had to keep his name. In Ostfriesland, the law was ignored until at least 1811.

== Origin ==
Ge(e)rdes is a patronymic derived from the name "Gerd", short for Gerard, meaning "hard spear", or from the Norse goddess Gerd (meaning "Gerd's protection"), wife of Freyr and protectress of the home yard and garden, from which she also derives her name as a personification of the garden/yard.

== People ==
- David Gerdes (born 1964), American astrophysicist
- Eduard Gerdes (1821–1898), Dutch lyric writer and author
- George Gerdes (disambiguation), multiple people
- Herbert Gerdes, German director
- Hans-Peter Geerdes (born 1964), lead singer of the German band Scooter
- Michael Gerdes (born 1960), German politician
- Paulus Gerdes (1952–2014), Dutch ethnomathematician
- Roswitha Gerdes (born 1961), German middle-distance runner
