= Brogne Abbey =

Abbey in Belgium

- Abbaye Saint-Gérard de Brogne
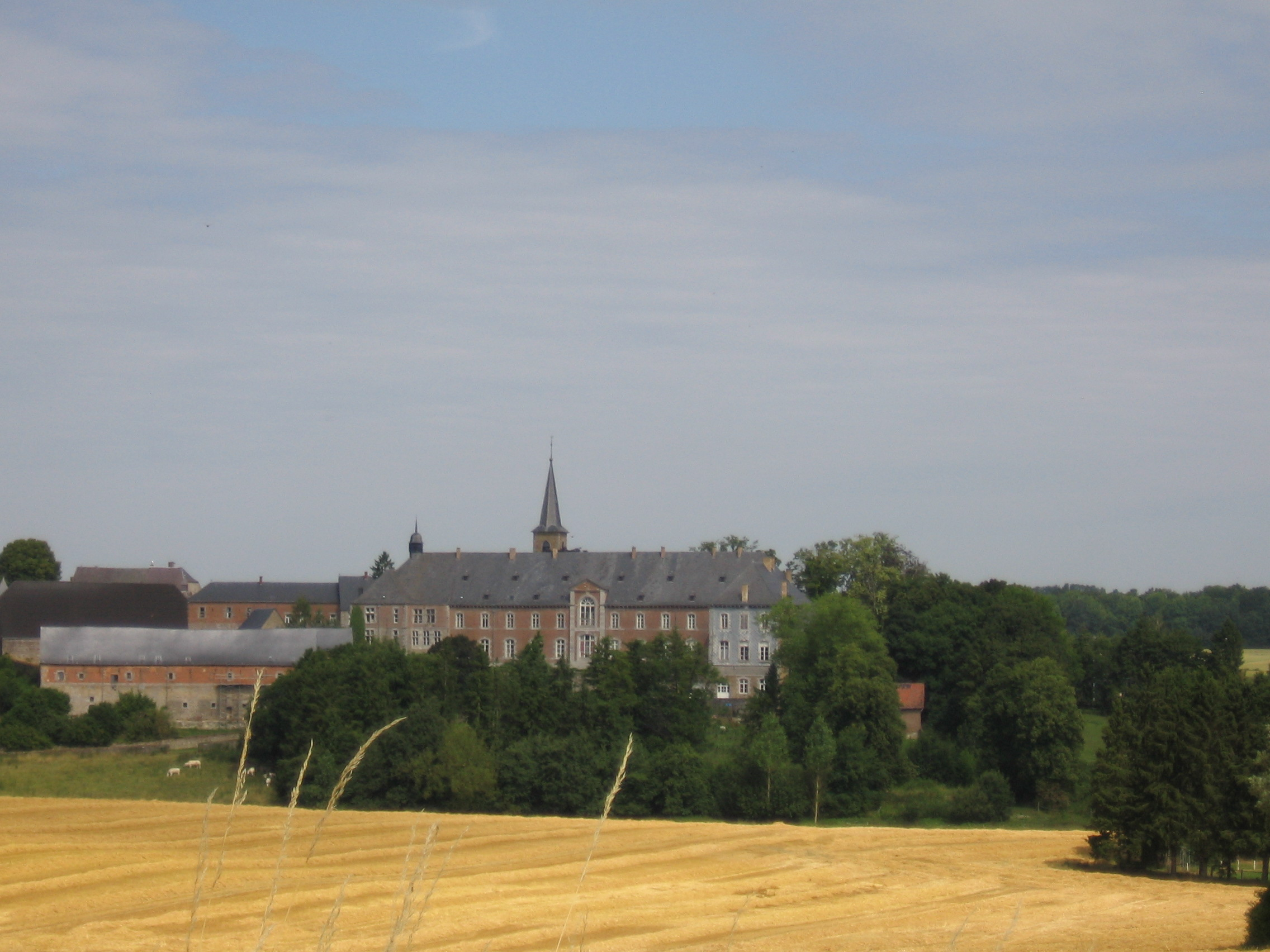
- Interactive map of Brogne Abbey

Monastery information
- Order: Benedictine
- Established: before 920
- Disestablished: 1796
- Diocese: Liège (to 1559); Namur (from 1559)

Architecture
- Heritage designation: listed building
- Designated date: 1995

Site
- Coordinates: 50.6205°N 4.9549°E
- Website: www.brogne.be

Brogne Abbey (French: Abbaye de Brogne), also known as the Abbey of Saint-Gerard of Brogne, was a Benedictine abbey founded in the early 10th century by Gerard of Brogne in the village of Brogne (now the Saint-Gérard subdivision of Mettet, Wallonia, Belgium). It was dedicated to Saint Peter and to Saint Gérard. They abbey was suppressed in 1796.

== Foundation and early history ==
Gerard founded the abbey on his own land, with the blessing of Stephen of Liège (died 920), and acquired a relic of Saint Eugenius of Toledo with the assistance of the abbot of Saint Denis. A charter of 923 granted land in Hesbaye to the monastery.

The abbey received notable confirmations of its independence and privileges in 992, from Emperor Otto III who was visiting the abbey together with Notker of Liège, and in 1183 from Pope Lucius III.

The abbacy of Robert (1196-1221) who was abbot of both Brogne and the nearby monastery of Lobbes, was an era of revitalization of the abbey. Robert embarked on a program of construction and rehabilitation of the convent and church at Brogne. Under Robert, Brogne received another papal confirmation from Pope Innocent III and in 1215 Robert even traveled to the Fourth Lateran Council.

== Relics and the Holy Cross of Brogne ==
In addition to the relic of Eugenius of Toledo, the abbey of Brogne possessed a number of important relics. They included the body of the monastery's founder Gerard, which were elevated upon his formal canonization in 1131. They also included relics of the Holy Innocents, supposedly discovered in 1116.

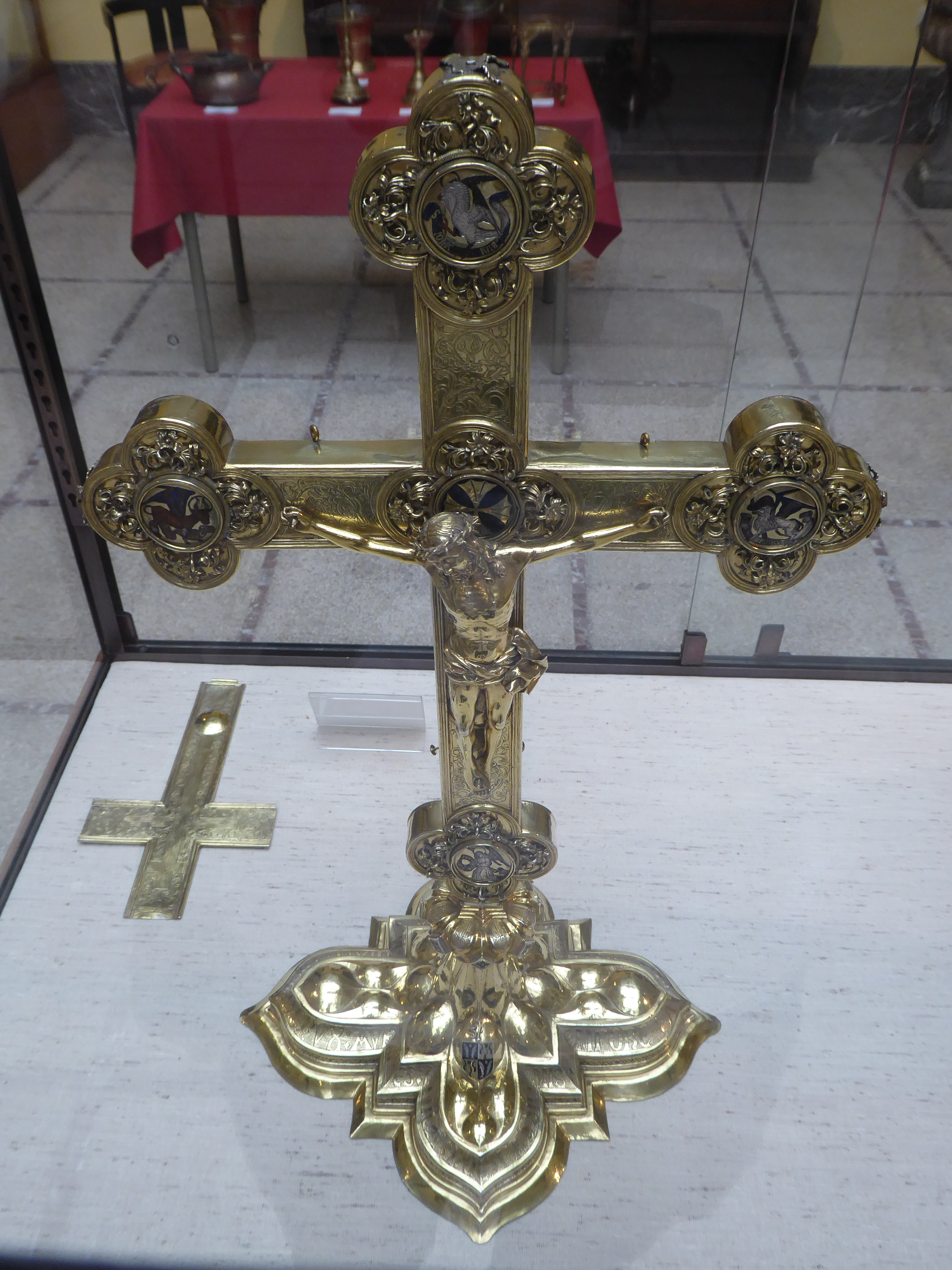
Cross of Brogne, Diocesan Museum and Treasury of the Cathedral, Namur

While on his deathbed in 1176, the local nobleman Manasses of Hierges promised the monastery of Brogne a major relic of the True Cross that he had brought back with him from the kingdom of Jerusalem. After his death in 1177, the relic was the subject of a dispute between his heirs and the monastery, who were ultimately successful in securing the cross later that year. The monks composed two accounts describing how Manasses had acquired the relic on crusade and how it had come to Brogne. The second of these accounts, How the Holy Cross Came from Antioch to the Monastery of Brogne, is a major work of history and hagiography and was written by an unknown author in 1211. The cult of the cross at Brogne attracted gifts and resulted in miracle stories.

In 1505 Guillaume de Beez, abbot of Brogne commissioned a new silver reliquary to house the relic originally acquired by Manasses. That reliquary is now kept at the Diocesan Museum and Treasury of the cathedral of Namur. The original reliquary can still be seen by removing the rear panels of the larger 1505 reliquary.

== Later history and decline ==
In 1566 the revenues of the abbacy were assigned to the recently founded Diocese of Namur by a bull of Pope Pius IV. Thereafter the monastery was governed by a prior on behalf of the bishop of Namur. In 1656 the monastery was incorporated into the Bursfelde Congregation. Just which revenues were due to the bishop remained subject to dispute, petitions and sometimes litigation until the abbey was suppressed in 1796.

The buildings of the former monastery were acquired by the municipality of Mettet in 1974, and were listed as built heritage in 1995. At least for some years, the early 80's, the abbey was used as a youth hostel by the Belgian Youth hostels association. Since 2013 they have housed a microbrewery, and since 2015 a centre for viticulture.

== Abbots ==
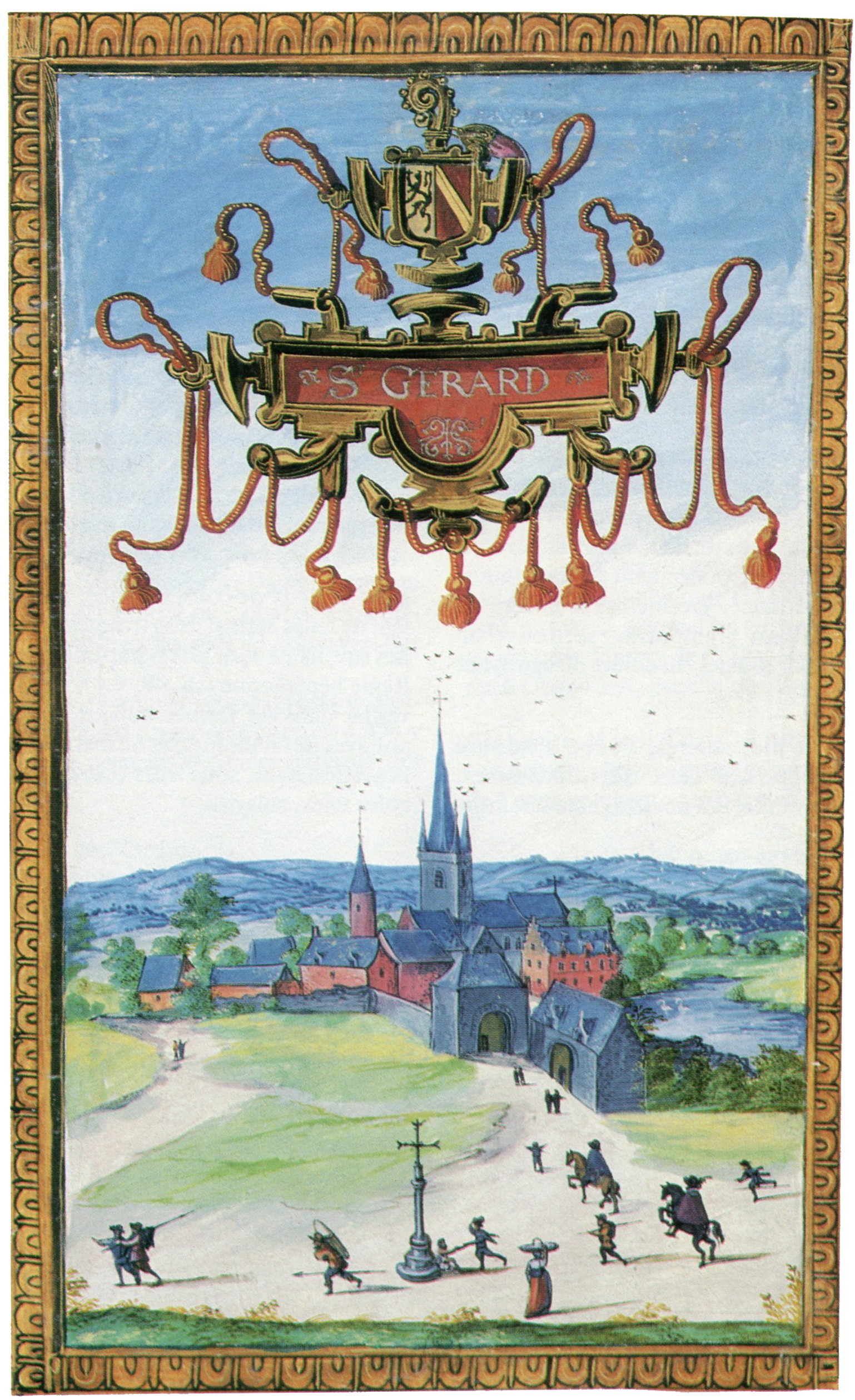
Brogne Abbey in 1604

- Gerard of Brogne (died 959)
- Heribert
- Guinebald
- Reiner
- Gonther
- Boso (died 1085)
- Guerimond
- Thomas
- Arnold (died 1106)
- Stephen (died 1114)
- Ebroin (died 1140)
- Gerard (died 1156)
- Godfrey (died 1161)
- Libuin (died 1185)
- Lambert (died 1234)
- Arnold (died 1192)
- Robert (died 1221/22)
- Thomas (died 1268)
- Gerard (died 1291)
- Lambert (died 1293)
- Baldwin of Riwenchies (died 1301)
- Thomas de Hanèche (died 1310)
- Gerard (died 1313)
- Alard (died 1353)
- Henri de Falize (died 1380)
- Jean Buffetial (died 1400)
- Walter de Falize
- Jean de Liernu (died 1433)
- Nicolas de Lesves (died 1448)
- Nicolas Cardin (died 1452)
- Guillaume de Graux (died 1483)
- Jacques Le Tourier (died 1503)
- Guillaume de Beez (died 1507)
- Thomas Badry (resigned 1512; died 1516)
- Guillaume Caulier (died 1550)
- Benoît de Mailly (died 1564)

Thereafter the bishops of Namur held the abbacy in commendam.
