= Von Guerard =

Von Guerard may refer to:

- Eugene von Guerard (1811–1901), Austrian painter, active in Australia 1852–1882
- Theodor von Guérard (1863–1943), German politician
- Von Guerard Glacier, a glacier between Crescent Glacier and Aiken Glacier
- Von Guerard Stream, a glacial meltwater stream

== See also ==
- Guerard (disambiguation)
