= Garritsen =

Garritsen is a Dutch patronymic surname. Notable people with the name include:

- Margaret Garritsen de Vries née Margaret Garritsen (1922–2009), American economist
- Martin Garrix (birth name Martijn Garritsen; born 1996), Dutch DJ, record producer and musician
- Nel Garritsen (1933–2014), Dutch swimmer

== See also ==
- Gerritsen
