= Gerhardus =

Gerhardus and its shortened form Hardus are masculine given names of Dutch-language origin. People with those names include:

- Bernardus Gerhardus Fourie (AKA Brand Fourie, 1916–2008), South African youth pastor
- Francois Gerhardus Joubert (1827–1903), Boer general
- Rudolph Gerhardus Snyman (born 1995), South African rugby union player
- Gerhardus Liebenberg (born 1972), South African cricketer
- Gerhardus Petrus Christiaan de Kock (1926–89), South African banker, sixth Governor of the ABSA Bank
- Gerhardus Pienaar (born 1981), South African javelin thrower
- Hardus Viljoen (Gerhardus C. Viljoen, born 1989), South African cricketer
- Johannes Gerhardus Strijdom (1893–1958), Prime Minister of South Africa 1954–58
- Johannes Maritz (Johannes Gerhardus Maritz, born 1990), Namibian hurdler

== See also ==
- Gerardus Mercator (1512–94), Flemish cartographer
- Gerard (disambiguation)
- Gerhard (disambiguation)
