= 2014 UZ224 =

Scattered disc object

2014 UZ_{224}
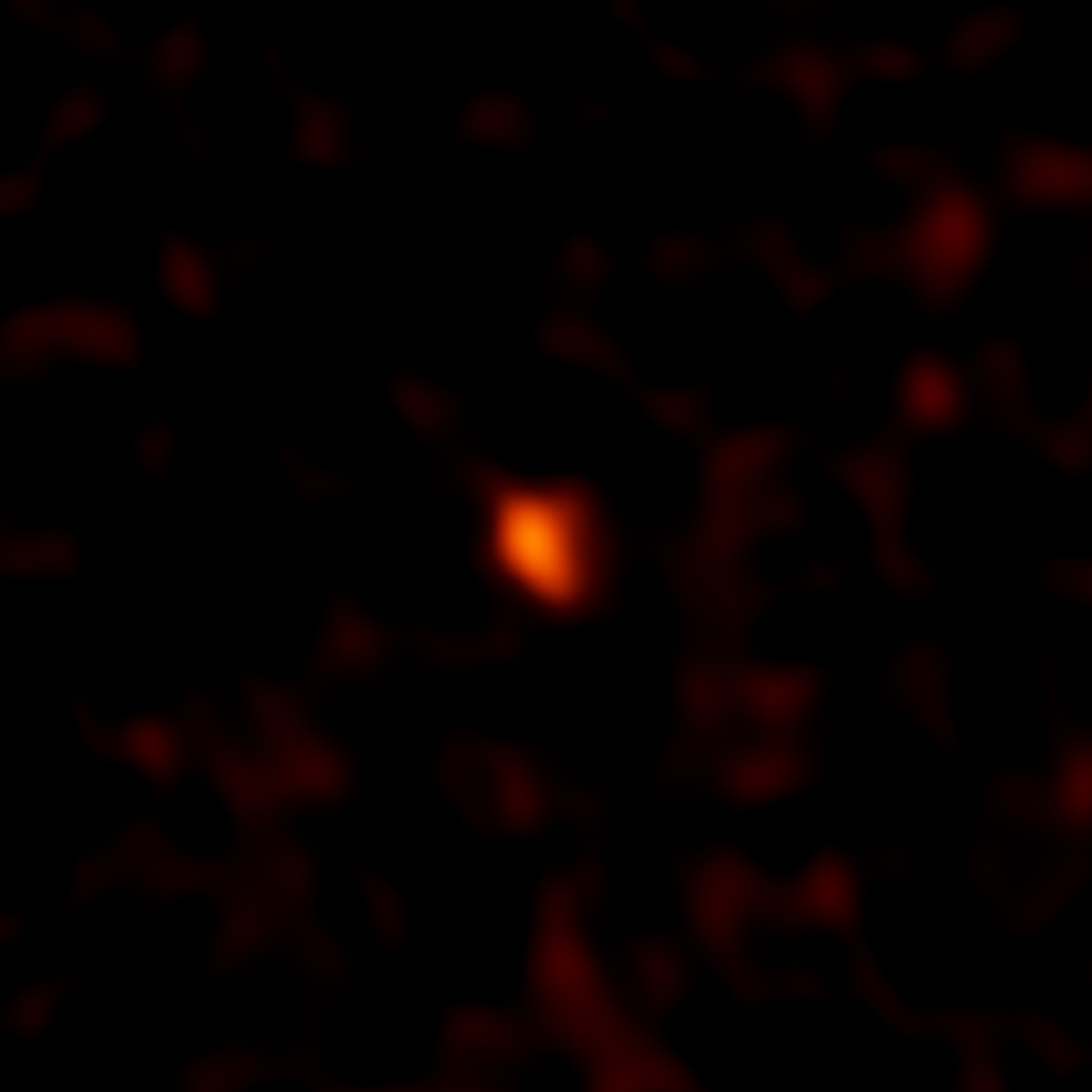
- 2014 UZ_{224} imaged by ALMA

Discovery
- Discovered by: David Gerdes et al.
- Discovery site: Cerro Tololo Obs.
- Discovery date: 21 October 2014

Designations
- Alternative designations: "DeeDee" (nickname)
- Minor planet category: TNO · SDO

Orbital characteristics
- Epoch 05 May 2025 (JD 2460800.5)
- Uncertainty parameter 4
- Observation arc: 15.98 yr (5,836 days)
- Earliest precovery date: 15 October 2006
- Aphelion: 181.17±0.23 AU
- Perihelion: 38.695±0.011 AU
- Semi-major axis: 109.93±0.14 AU
- Eccentricity: 0.648
- Orbital period (sidereal): 1152.6±2.2 yr (421000±820 days)
- Mean anomaly: 323.47±0.09°
- Mean motion: 0° 0^{m} 3.096^{s} / day
- Inclination: 26.7787°
- Longitude of ascending node: 131.133±0.003°
- Time of perihelion: 23 April 2142 ±26 days
- Argument of perihelion: 28.55±0.03°
- Known satellites: 0
- Earth MOID: 37.5405 AU
- Jupiter MOID: 33.2245 AU
- T_{Jupiter}: 6.285

Physical characteristics
- Mean diameter: 635+57 −62 km
- Mass: 0.0266×10^{−3} M_{🜨} (est.)
- Geometric albedo: 0.131+0.038 −0.028
- Temperature: 30 K
- Spectral type: g–r = 0.77±0.11 r–i = 0.39±0.07 i-z = 0.22±0.16
- Apparent magnitude: 23.38±0.05 (V) 22.98±0.04 (r)
- Absolute magnitude (H): 3.5; 3.48 (JPL)

2014 UZ_{224} is a large trans-Neptunian object and possible dwarf planet orbiting in the scattered disc of the outermost regions of the Solar System, estimated to be around 550 to 700 km (350 to 450 miles) in diameter. As of 2021, it is approximately 89.7 AU (13.42 billion km) from the Sun, and will slowly decrease in distance until it reaches its perihelion of 38 AU in 2142. The discoverers have nicknamed it "DeeDee" for "Distant Dwarf".

2014 UZ_{224} was discovered by a team led by David Gerdes using data collected by the large camera Dark Energy Camera (DECam). The discovery was announced by the Minor Planet Center on 11 October 2016. Assuming its nominal diameter of 635 km (395 mi), it reflects just 13 percent of the sunlight that hits it. The earliest known precovery observations of 2014 UZ_{224} were taken at the Mauna Kea Observatory on 15 October 2006.

2014 UZ_{224} has not yet been imaged by high-resolution telescopes, so it has no known moons. The Hubble Space Telescope is planned to image 2014 UZ_{224} in 2026, which should determine if it has any significantly sized moons.

== Orbit ==
Discovery images of 2014 UZ_{224} by DECam from 21 and 23 October 2014

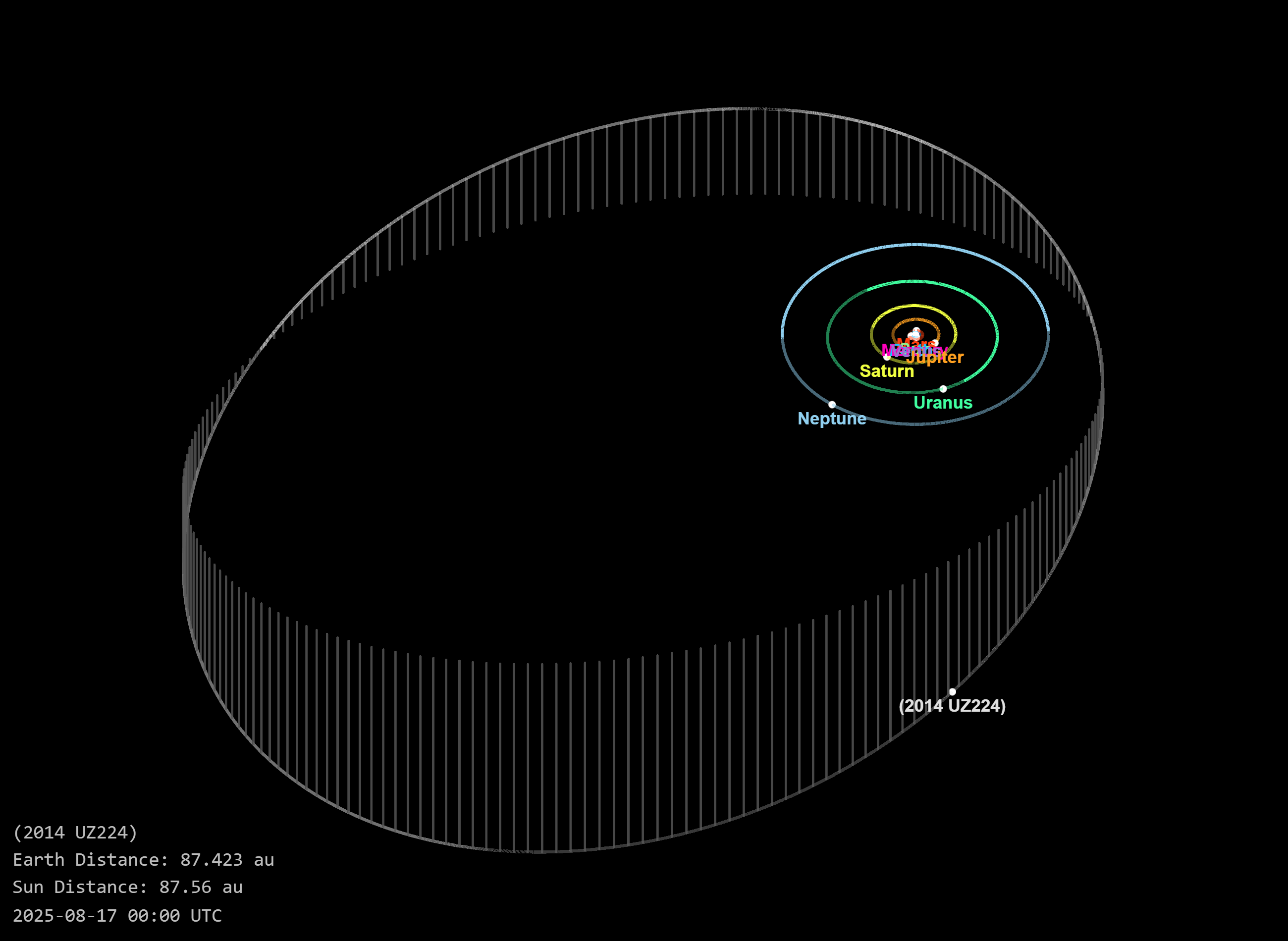
Diagram showing the orbits of 2014 UZ_{224} (gray) and the outer planets. The vertical gray lines along 2014 UZ_{224}'s orbit mark its vertical positions above and below the ecliptic plane.

2014 UZ_{224} orbits the Sun once every approximately 1,150 years and at the current point in its orbit is the second farthest known object from the Sun with a stable orbit. Its perihelion is calculated to be a bit closer than Pluto's semi-major axis, and it is calculated to reach it in 2142.

=== Orbital stability ===
Gerdes et al. simulated 100000 clones of the orbit of 2014 UZ_{224} for 1 billion years (1 Gyr). It remains close to its orbit over the time of the simulations and does not undergo libration, even with the potentially destabilizing interactions with Neptune, and being in possibly a 7:1 mean-motion resonance with Neptune. They also performed several simulations of the entire 4.5 Gyr history of the Solar System, and remained stable.

In a 2021 study by Muñoz-Gutiérrez et al. analyzed and simulated the orbit of 2014 UZ_{224} over a period of 1 Gyr. They simulated that 2014 UZ_{224}'s orbital stability is unstable over a time scale of 1 Gyr, however they calculate a diffusion time of 55.069 Gyr, making it very stable.

== Physical characteristics ==
=== Diameter, mass and albedo ===
Size comparison of Pluto and 2014 UZ_{224}

2014 UZ_{224} has a measured diameter of 635+57
−62 km, using optical measurements, and using thermal measurements from the Atacama Large Millimeter Array in the Atacama Desert of northern Chile. They assume a spherical body, and a uniform surface for this diameter.

2014 UZ_{224} has no measured mass, due to it not having a known moon as of 2026, however Muñoz-Gutiérrez et al. estimates a mass of 0.0266×10^{−3} M_{🜨} (1.58861×10^{20} kg).

=== Interior ===
Gerdes et al. states that 2014 UZ_{224} is likely a dwarf planet with a mixed ice-rock composition.

However, a planetary study by William M. Grundy and others suggests that trans-Neptunian objects in the 400–1000 km size range form a transition zone between small, low-density bodies and large, dense dwarf planets. Since 2014 UZ_{224} has an diameter of 635+57
−62 km, it falls in this transition zone.

=== Surface and spectra ===
2014 UZ_{224} has color indices of: g-r of 0.77±0.11; r-i of 0.39±0.07; i-z of 0.22±0.16, with a geometric albedo of 0.131+0.038
−0.028. Using the diameter of 635+57
−62 km, they assume a uniform surface for the diameter. 2014 UZ_{224} has a surface temperature of about 30 K (−243.2 °C) as of 2017.

== Numbering and naming ==
As of 2025, 2014 UZ_{224} has not been numbered by the Minor Planet Center, as the uncertainty of its orbit is still large. The discoverers will have sole right to propose a name for ten years from the date it is numbered.

== See also ==
- List of Solar System objects most distant from the Sun
