= Gerald (disambiguation) =

Gerald is a given name.

Gerald may also refer to:

== People ==
- Gerald (given name), people with the given name
- Gerald of Wales
- Saint Gerald (disambiguation), several saints

== Fictional characters ==
- Gerald Johanssen, fictional character in the Nickelodeon animated television series Hey Arnold!
- Gerald Robotnik, fictional character in the Sonic the Hedgehog video game series
- Gerald (wrestler), one of the Harris Brothers

== Places ==
- Gerald, Alabama
- Gerald, Illinois
- Gerald, Indiana
- Gerald, Missouri, a city
- Gerald, Ohio
- Gerald, Oklahoma (historical)
- Gerald, Saskatchewan, a Canadian village
- Gerald, Texas, former name of the town of Ponder, Texas
- Gerald, Texas (historical), a former US village near Leroy, Texas

== Other uses ==
- GERALD, a dataset of German railway signals for machine learning
- Gerald (film), a 2010 American film
- The Gerald, the Premier Service train between Holyhead and Cardiff
