= Cook County Hospital =

Hospital in Chicago, Illinois, US

John H Stroger Jr Hospital of Cook County
- Cook County Health
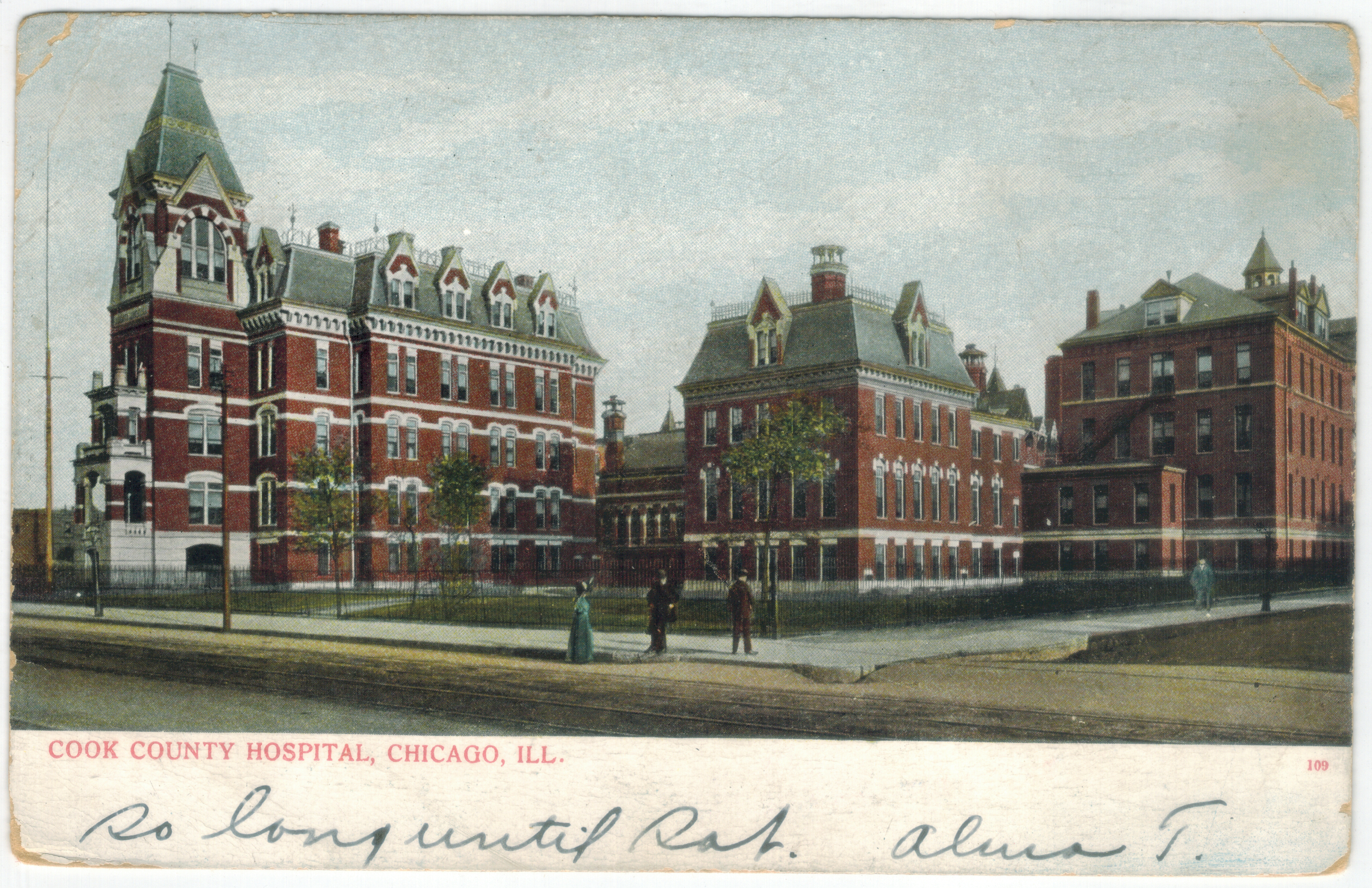
- Cook County Hospital before 1911

Geography
- Location: 1901 West Harrison Street (Illinois Medical District), Chicago, Illinois, United States
- Coordinates: 41°52′20″N 87°40′29″W

Organization
- Care system: Public hospital
- Type: Teaching hospital
- Affiliated university: Rush Medical College

Services
- Emergency department: Level I Adult Trauma Center / Level I Pediatric Trauma Center
- Beds: 464

History
- Former name: Cook County Hospital (until 2001–2002)
- Founded: 1834 (192 years ago) (as Cook County Hospital)

Links
- Website: cookcountyhealth.org/locations/john-h-stroger-jr-hospital-of-cook-county
- Lists: Hospitals in Illinois
- Cook County Hospital
- U.S. National Register of Historic Places
- Area: less than one acre
- Built: 1912 (114 years ago)
- Architects: Gerhardt, Paul Sr.; Griffiths, John, & Sons
- Architectural style: Beaux Arts
- NRHP reference No.: 06001017
- Added to NRHP: November 8, 2006 (19 years ago)

Cook County Hospital, formally known as the John H Stroger Jr Hospital of Cook County, is a county-run public hospital in Chicago, Illinois, United States.

It is part of Cook County Health, along with Provident Hospital of Cook County and several related centers, which provides public primary, specialty, and tertiary healthcare services to residents of Cook County, Illinois. Cook County Health also includes CountyCare, a Medicaid managed-care plan.

Cook County Hospital was founded 1832, and became an innovative teaching hospital. In 2001–2002, it moved into new quarters adjacent to its historic Beaux-Arts complex in the Illinois Medical District and was renamed for hospital board president John H. Stroger Jr.

== Facility and location ==
Cook County Hospital employs three hundred attending physicians and over four hundred fellows and medical residents. It has 1.2 million square feet (110,000 m^{2}) of floor space, and 464 beds. It is located at 1901 West Harrison Street, and is a part of the 305-acre (1.2 km^{2}) Illinois Medical District on Chicago's West Side, which is one of the largest concentrations of medical facilities in the world.

== History ==
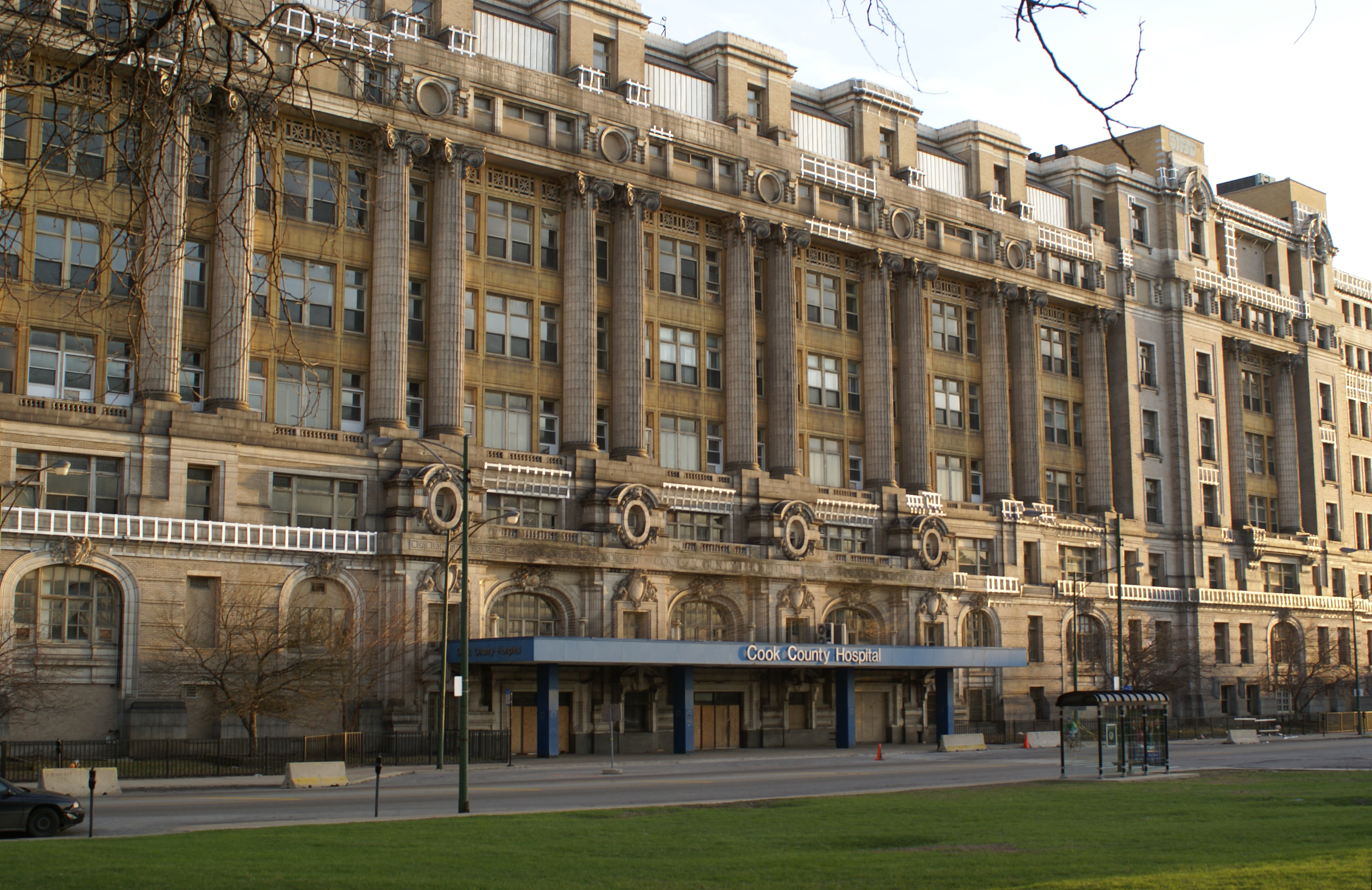
Facade of the old Cook County Hospital, photographed in 2008

Cook County Hospital, which opened in 1857, was used as a teaching hospital by Rush Medical School until the American Civil War, when it was transitioned to an army hospital. After the war, it continued its purpose as a center for medical education and founded the first medical internship in the country in 1866.

By the 1900s, the hospital was overseen by surgeons and physicians in Chicago who volunteered their services at the hospital, which was rebuilt in 1916. Regarded as one of the world's-greatest teaching hospitals, many interns, residents, and graduate physicians came to see the medical and surgical advances. Innovations included the world's first blood bank and surgical fixation of fractures. In the 1930s, Dr. Bernard Fantus, after finding ways to lengthen the preservation of blood outside the body, invented and opened the world's first blood bank, the Cook County Hospital Blood Bank. In the early 1960s, William Shoemaker, a student of the surgical physiologist, Francis Daniels Moore, spearheaded surgical critical care when he organized the first Burn and Trauma Unit.

In 1986, Agnes D. Lattimer was appointed medical director of Cook County Hospital, making her the first black woman to serve as medical director of a major American hospital.

Cook County Hospital was renamed for John H. Stroger Jr., the then-president of the Cook County Board, in 2001.

The new Cook County (Stroger) Hospital was opened in December 2002, and is housed in a facility located adjacent to the old hospital building.

The former Cook County Hospital building was renovated and reopened as a privately funded mixed-use development, and Hyatt Hotel.

== In popular culture ==
- County General Hospital, a fictional hospital that served as the setting for the NBC serial medical drama ER, was loosely based on Cook County Hospital; in the first episode a patient refers to the hospital as "Cook County General" during a cognitive test.
- Cook County Hospital is also used in the 1993 movie The Fugitive.
- The documentary I Call It Murder aired on the BBC television show Man Alive in 1979, which reported on the challenges facing the staff at Cook County Hospital. At that time, the hospital was one of the few free hospitals in the United States.
- In 1996, Diana, Princess of Wales visited patients and doctors in the AIDS ward and trauma center, while on a tour of Chicago.
- In the book series The Dresden Files, Stroger Hospital is mentioned by name and is a setting for various scenes across several books.
