= Leading Teams =

Australian consulting company

- Type: Private
- Industry: Consulting
- Founded: 1992
- Headquarters: Melbourne, Australia
- Area served: Australia
- Key people: Ray McLean, Founding Director
- Services: Professional development; Team building; Culture change; Team development
- Number of employees: 23 (2021)
- Website: leadingteams.net.au

Leading Teams is an Australian consulting company focusing on the fields of sport, business, government, and education. The company's services revolve around its "Performance Improvement Program", which involves leadership development, team building, and culture change.

Founding director Ray McLean began a pilot program in 1992 involving the Central District Football Club in South Australia. The program was regarded as successful and attracted attention from other SANFL teams and garnered much attention among other teams in the South Australian National Football League, which led other SANFL clubs to explore similar programs. McLean also reoriented the program to address corporate objectives and apply the principles of the model in business settings.

As of October 2014, Leading Teams has facilitators located in Melbourne, Sydney, Perth, Adelaide, and Queensland.

The company's partners and facilitators include Simon Fletcher, Gerard Murphy, Kurt Wrigley, Daniel Healy, Justin Peckett, Aaron Rogers, and Craig Hodges.

== Recognition ==
- Australian Business Journal Innovation in Corporate Services Award (2012)
