= Saint-Gérard, Belgium =

Saint-Gérard Sint-Djuråd (Walloon)
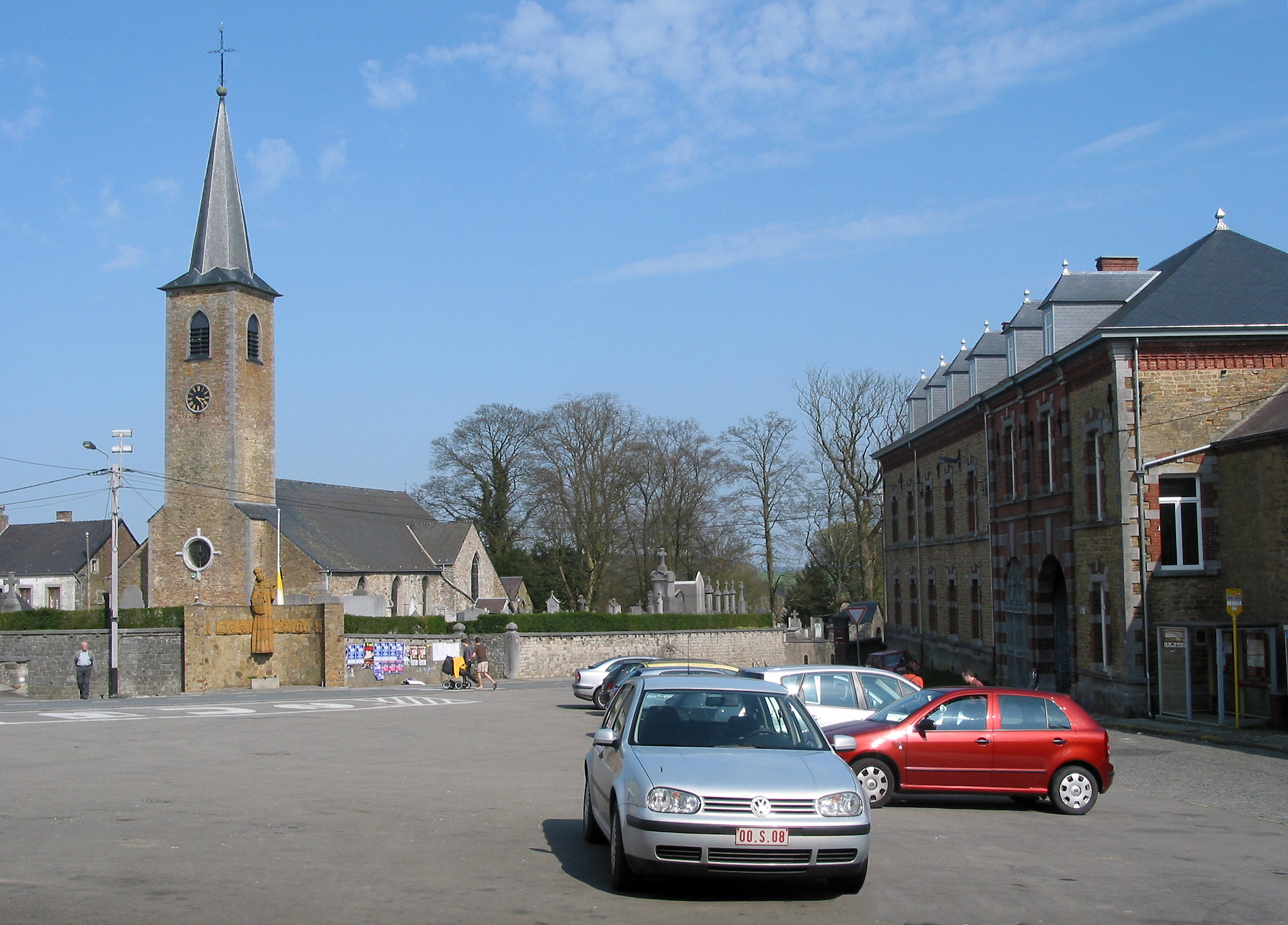
- Saint-Gérard

- Location within Belgium Location within Europe
- Coordinates: 50°18′N 04°42′E
- Country: Belgium
- Region: Wallonia
- Province: Namur
- Municipality: Mettet

Saint-Gérard (French pronunciation: [sɛ̃ ʒeʁaʁ]; Walloon: Sint-Djuråd) is a village of Wallonia and a district of the municipality of Mettet, located in the province of Namur, Belgium.

Its name refers to Gerard of Brogne, who founded Brogne Abbey here in the 10th century. The place, originally called Brogne, was subsequently named after the saint.
