= Saint Gerard =

Saint Gerard or Gérard may refer to:

== People ==
- Gérard of Brogne (c. 895–959), abbot in Belgium
- Gerard of Toul (935–994), bishop of Toul, now in France
- Gerard of Csanád (980–1046), bishop of Csanád
- Gerard of Potenza (died 1118), bishop of Potenza in Italy
- Gerard of Clairvaux (died 1138), French monk
- Gerard of Lunel (1275–1298), French saint
- Gerard Majella (1726–1755), Italian saint

== Other ==
- St. Gerard Majella Annual Novena, Dundalk, Ireland
- Saint-Gérard, Belgium, a village in Wallonia

== See also ==
- Blessed Gerard (c. 1040–1120), Benedictine and founder of the Order of St John of Jerusalem
