= Gerrits =

Gerrits or Gerits is a Dutch and German patronymic surname derived from the given name Gerrit, a shortened form of Gerhard. Notable people with the surname include:

- Antonie Gerrits, Dutch cyclist
- Evelien Gerrits, Dutch cricketer
- Kris Gerits, Belgian cyclist
- Travis Gerrits, Canadian freestyle skier
