= Cairo Supper Club Building =

Egyptian Revival built 1920, Chicago

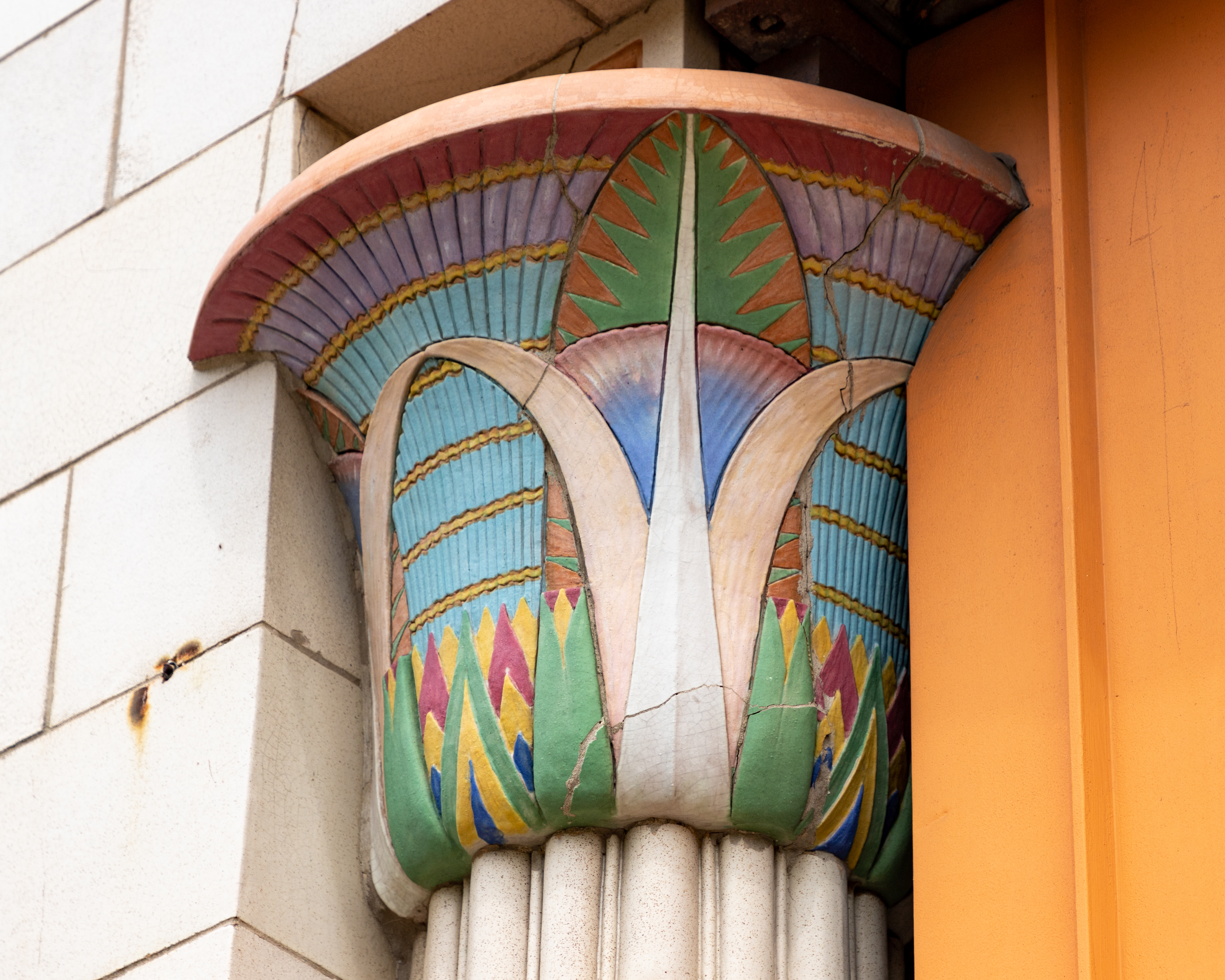
Lotus capital column, detail, 4015–4017 North Sheridan Road

The Cairo Supper Club Building is a one-story, terra-cotta-clad building in the Buena Park Historic District of Chicago, Illinois, United States. Located at 4015–4017 N. Sheridan Road (41°57′19″N 87°39′15.8″W), Cairo Supper House is a notable instance of Egyptian Revival-style architecture in Chicago. Originally known as the Winston Building, it was designed in 1920 by architect Paul Gerhardt Sr. The building was hit with a drive-by fire bombing in May 1964 when a man in a white Cadillac tossed an incendiary device through a window. The building was designated a Chicago Landmark in 2014.
