= Gerhart =

Gerhart is a surname and given name. Notable people with the name include:

== As a given name ==
- Gerhart Baum (1932–2025), German lawyer and politician, Federal Minister of the Interior
- Gerhart Eisler (1897–1968), German communist politician
- Gerhart Friedlander (1916–2009), nuclear chemist who worked on the Manhattan Project
- Gerhart Hauptmann (1882–1946), German dramatist and Nobel Prize winner
- Gerhart Jander (1892–1961), German inorganic chemist
- Gerhart Lüders (1920–1995), German theoretical physicist
- Gerhart M. Riegner (1911–2001), sender of the Riegner Telegram (the first official communication of the planned Holocaust) and secretary-general of the World Jewish Congress
- Gerhart Schirmer (1913–2004), highly decorated German soldier of World War II

== As a surname ==
- Bobby Gerhart (born 1958), American professional stock car racing driver
- Edgar Gerhart (1923–1992), Canadian lawyer, judge and politician from Alberta
- Emanuel Vogel Gerhart (1817–1904), U.S. minister of the German Reformed Church
- H. L. Gerhart (1897–1989), American politician from Nebraska
- John K. Gerhart (1907–1981), U.S. Air Force general
- Klaus Gerhart (born 1965), American erotic photographer
- Garth Gerhart (born 1988), American professional football player
- Robert Gerhart (1920–2021), American politician from Pennsylvania
- Toby Gerhart (born 1987), American professional football player
- Todd Gerhart (born 1962), American professional football player

== See also ==
- Gerhard
- Gerhardt
- Gérard
