= Agnes D. Lattimer =

African American Pediatrician and Educator

- Lattimer in 1968
- Born: 1928; Memphis, Tennessee
- Died: January 9, 2018 (aged 89–90); Chicago, Illinois
- Education: Fisk University; Chicago Medical School
- Occupations: Educator, Administrator, Physician

Agnes D. Lattimer (1928–2018) was a pediatrician. In 1986 she was appointed as the medical director of Cook County Hospital, making her the first African American woman medical director of a major hospital.

== Biography ==
Lattimer was born 1928 and grew up in Memphis, Tennessee. She graduated in 1949 from Fisk University with a degree in biology.. She subsequently attended Chicago Medical School, one of two women in the class of 1954.

In 1958 Lattimer went into private practice in pediatrics. Over time she shifted from practicing medicine to teaching medicine. She taught in the Department of Pediatrics at Chicago Medical School. She became chair of the Division of Ambulatory Pediatrics at Cook County Hospital in 1971. In 1986 she became medical director of Cook County Hospital, becoming the first African American woman to direct a major American hospital.

in the 1960s Lattimer served as chairman of the Chicago Committee Against Lead Poisoning, advocating for the city to change its housing code to include fines for landlords failing to remove paint chips and loose plaster.

Lattimer retired from Cook County Hospital in 1995.

== Personal life ==
After graduating from Fisk, Lattimer worked as a housekeeper for a time in order to save money to attend medical school. She was married twice; first to the artist Bernard Goss which ended in divorce, the second time to Frank Bethel who died several years after their 1971 wedding. She earned a pilot's license in 1966. She also held the title "senior life master" for her accomplished bridge playing.

Lattimer died on January 9, 2018, in Chicago.
