= Aaron Rogers =

Australian rules footballer (born 1984)

Personal information
- Born: 5 January 1984 (age 42)
- Original team: NSW/ACT Rams
- Draft: 26th overall, 2001 AFL draft (Melbourne)
- Height: 192 cm (6 ft 4 in)
- Weight: 86 kg (190 lb)

Playing career^{1}
Years	Club	Games (Goals)
2002–2003	Melbourne	0 (0)
2004	Sydney	2 (0)
Total		2 (0)
- ^{1} Playing statistics correct to the end of 2004.

Aaron Charles Rogers (born 5 January 1984) is a former Australian rules footballer who played in the Australian Football League (AFL).

Born in Sydney, New South Wales, Rogers played in the Sydney AFL with St George.

He was recruited to the Melbourne Football Club in the 2001 AFL draft. However, it was not until he was traded to the Sydney Swans in 2004 that he made his debut. After limited game time and a total of just four disposals over his two matches, he was delisted at the end of the 2004 season. Aaron Rogers played for AFL Canberra side the Eastlake Demons.

Rogers was a member of the 2010 Morningside Australian Football Club premiership team. He was their senior coach in 2012 and 2013, before joining the Gold Coast Football Club's NEAFL team's coaching group in 2014.

Aaron is now a facilitator at Leading Teams.
