= Gerretsen =

Gerretsen, Gerrets and Gerretse are Dutch patronymic surnames. Notable people with this name include:

- Boris Gerrets (1948–2020), Dutch-born film director
- Chas Gerretsen (born 1943), Dutch photojournalist
- John Gerretsen (born 1942), Canadian politician
- Mark Gerretsen (born 1975), Canadian politician
- Wolphert Gerretse van Kouwenhoven (1579–1662), Dutch settler in New Netherland known by his patronym Gerretse

== See also ==
- Gerritsen
- Gerritszoon
