= Gerardo Meléndez =

Puerto Rican scientist

Gerardo J. Meléndez is a San Juan, Puerto Rico-born scientist who served as Director of the Armaments Research Development Engineering Center (ARDEC) headquartered at Picatinny Arsenal in New Jersey from 2010 until his Civil Service retirement in May 2014.

During his civilian career with the U.S. Army, which began in 1983 as an electronics engineer for the U.S. Army Communications and Electronics Command in New Jersey, Meléndez was a strong advocate of incorporating commercial technological advances in military applications, including equipment based on consumer products generated by companies such as Apple Inc. and Microsoft. He also served as chief of the Automatic Target Recognition Team for the Product Manager Tactical Endurance Synthetic Aperture Radar, as well as chief of the Intelligence and Information Warfare Directorate’s Battle Space Identification Branch. in 2014 he retired after 31 years of Army civilian in ceremony at Picatinny Arsenal.

He is a graduate of Tulane University in New Orleans, Louisiana, where he obtained his Bachelor of Science degree in biomedical engineering in 1980, and Brown University in Providence, Rhode Island, where he obtained a Master of Science degree in electrical engineering in 1983, and he obtained his Ph.D. in electrical engineering at Drexel University in 1993. He subsequently earned a master's degree in strategic studies from the Army War College.

== Awards and distinctions ==
• Department of the Army Distinguished Civilian Service Award (2014)

• Department of the Army Fellowship (1987–1993)

• United States Army Communications-Electronics Research, Development and Engineering Center (CERDEC) Director Award for Technical Excellence (1989)

• United States Army Communications-Electronics Command (CECOM) Leader of the Year Award (1998)

• Executive Excellence in the Military awarded by Maj. Gen. Nick Justice at the 2010 Hispanic Engineer National Achievement Awards Conference (2010)

• Keynote speaker at the Society of Hispanic Professional Engineers Conference, Washington, D.C. (2010)

• College of Engineering Alumni Circle of Distinction (2012)
