= Gerard Murphy (Australian sports consultant) =

Personal information
- Nationality: Australian

Sport
- Sport: Netball, Australian rules football (consultant)
- Position: Head Coach
- League: Suncorp Super Netball
- Team: Melbourne Mavericks
- Now coaching: Geelong Cougars (2014–2025); Melbourne Mavericks (2025–present)

Gerard Murphy is an Australian consultant and coach for sporting teams.

He was a founder of Leading Teams and runs a consulting firm titled Gerard Murphy Consulting, which focuses on developing high performance programs in sports teams.

== Career ==
From 2007 to 2014, Murphy worked for the Geelong Cats in the Australian Football League.

In 2014, Murphy was appointed as a leadership consultant to the Richmond Tigers in the Australian Football League.

In July 2016, Murphy left the Tigers. It was reported that players were not satisfied with Murphy's style of leadership.

Murphy is part of a consortium that placed a bid for the Coventry City soccer team in the United Kingdom in April 2017. The consortium he led is known as the Australian Football Consortium.

In December 2025, Murphy was appointed head coach of the Melbourne Mavericks Super Netball team, following on from Tracey Neville. He previously served as a mentor to the Vixens Academy team. He served as head coach of the Vixens Academy reserve team in 2025 and was previously head coach of the Geelong Cougars in the Victorian Netball League since 2014.

In between the 2025 and 2026 seasons of the Australian Football League, Murphy acted as a consultant to the Sydney Swans' leadership.

=== Recognition ===
In April 2025, Murphy was nominated for the 2024 Leasexpress Coach of the Year during the Victorian Sports Awards for his work coaching men's and mixed teams in the Geelong Netball Club.
