= Paul Gerhardt Sr. =

American architect (1863–1951)

- Born: 1863; Germany
- Died: December 3, 1951 (aged 87–88); Cook County, Illinois, U.S.
- Occupation: Architect
- Notable work: Cook County Hospital (main building)

Paul Gerhardt Sr. (1863 – December 3, 1951) was a German-born American architect who lived and worked in Illinois, United States.

== Early life and education ==
He was educated at the Royal Academy of Arts Leipzig, located in Leipzig; the University of Berlin, located in Berlin; and the University of Hanover, located in Hanover.

== Career ==
Gerhardt came to the United States at age 25 and opened an office in Chicago in 1893.

Gerhart was the Chicago city architect from 1909 to 1912, during which time he designed the main building of Cook County Hospital (now known as the John H. Stroger Jr. Hospital of Cook County; and the Cook County Board of Education architect from 1930 to 1932.

He was known in his lifetime for his industrial–manufacturing buildings. He designed at least two Chicago Landmarks: the Cairo Supper Club Building on Sheridan Road and the Lindemann & Hoverson Company Showroom and Warehouse Building on West Washington Boulevard. While a board of education architect, he designed Lane Technical High School (now commonly known as Lane Tech College Prep High School).

Gerhart's son, Paul Gerhardt Jr., was Chicago city architect from 1929 until his death in 1966.

== Death ==
Having retired around 1946, Gerhardt died December 3, 1951, in Cook County, Illinois. In addition to his son, survivors included his wife, Marie. Lane Technical High School

== See also ==
- List of American architects
- List of Chicago Landmarks
- List of people from Chicago
