= Gerardo Lopez =

Gerardo Lopez may refer to:

- Gerardo I. Lopez, Cuban-American businessman
- Gerardo López Urbina (fl. 1930s), Chilean politician
- Gerardo López Villaseñor (born 1995), Mexican tennis player
- Gerardo López (canoer) (Gerardo López Espejo, born 1947), Spanish sprint canoer
- Gerry Lopez (born 1948), American surfer, journalist, and film actor
