= Gerhard Wack =

German politician

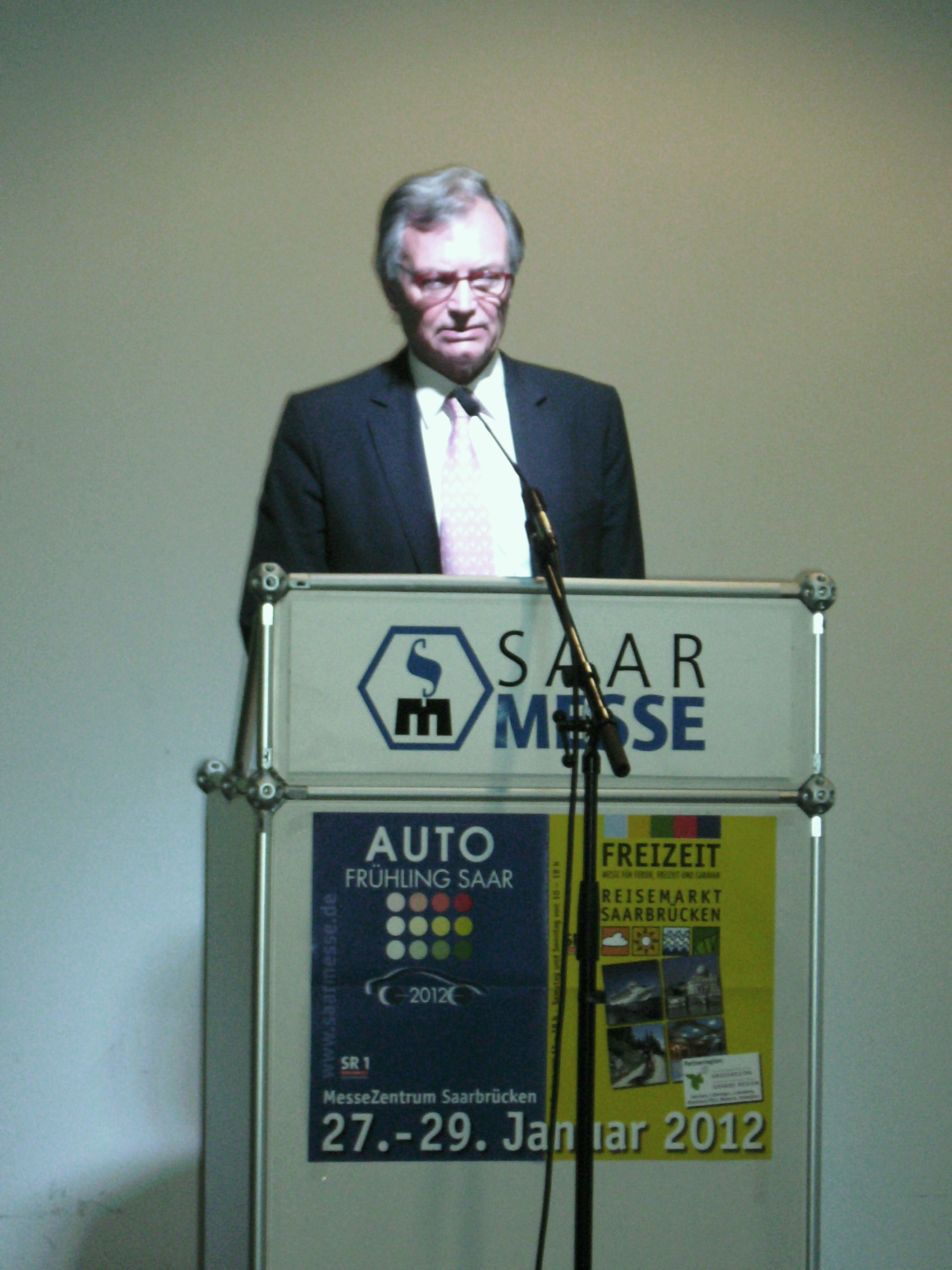
Wack in January 2012

Gerhard Wack (born 21 August 1945) is a German politician. He served as the State Secretary in the Ministry of Finance of Saarland from 1999 to 2012.

Born in Saarlouis, Wack studied law at Saarland University in Saarbrücken. He is married and has a daughter.
