= Gritz =

Gritz may refer to:

== People ==
- Bo Gritz (1939–2026), US Army Special Forces officer
- Ellen R. Gritz (born 1944), American psychologist and cancer researcher

== Other ==
- Watermelon, Chicken & Gritz, a 2002 musical album by the rap sextet Nappy Roots
- Gritz Blitz, a nickname for the 1977 Atlanta Falcons defense that allowed the fewest points per game (9.2) in NFL history
