= Teena Gerhardt =

American mathematician

Teena Meredith Gerhardt (born 1980) is a professor of mathematics at Michigan State University. Her research focuses on algebraic topology, including algebraic K-theory and equivariant stable homotopy theory.

== Education and career ==
Gerhardt studied mathematics as an undergraduate at Stanford University, graduating in 2002. She completed her Ph.D. in 2007 at the Massachusetts Institute of Technology. Her dissertation, The $R(S^1)$-graded equivariant homotopy of $\operatorname{THH}(\mathbb{F}_p)$, was supervised by Lars Hesselholt; it concerned the homotopy theory of the topological Hochschild homology ring of a finite field.

She was a Zorn Postdoctoral Fellow at Indiana University from 2007 until 2010, when she joined Michigan State University as an assistant professor. She was promoted to associate professor in 2017 and full professor in 2023.

== Recognition ==
Gerhardt has won multiple teaching awards at the Massachusetts Institute of Technology and Michigan State University. She was elected as a Fellow of the American Mathematical Society in the 2025 class of fellows. She was named as a Fellow of the Association for Women in Mathematics, in the 2027 class of fellows, "for her work ranging from local involvement with her AWM Student Chapter to her large-scale national service".
