= Sue Gerhardt =

British psychoanalytic psychotherapist

Sue Gerhardt (Durban, 1953) is a British psychoanalytic psychotherapist in private practice since 1997. She was born in South Africa, but grew up in England. She was educated at Newnham College, University of Cambridge, where she achieved a degree in English literature, and campaigned successfully for women to be given places in the previously single sex men's colleges. She was an active feminist. She was trained as a psychotherapist and achieved an MA in Child Observation at the Tavistock Clinic in London. In 1998 she co-founded the Oxford Parent Infant Project (OXPIP), a pioneering charity that provides psychotherapeutic help to parents and babies in Oxfordshire. She has two adult children and lives in Oxfordshire.

== Why Love Matters ==
Gerhardt is best known as the author of the bestselling and critically acclaimed Why Love Matters: How Affection Shapes a Baby's Brain (2004). The book presents evidence that babies' brains develop differently in the first few months of life depending on the amount and type of care they receive in that time. The evidence suggests that the prefrontal cortex and, within that, the orbitofrontal cortex are stimulated and interconnect more powerfully when a child is demonstrably loved. The advantage of positive development is increased confidence and an ability to empathise with others. Neglect can lead to increased anxiety, insensitivity and aggression.

The findings may have political implications, since the demand for parents to reduce the time they spend with their child because of work commitments leads to an increased emphasis on institutional child care.

There are also implications for gender politics as women are frequently expected to take on the burden of child care, rather than the father, and this developmental finding could be used to argue for a reduced role for women in the workplace.

Gerhardt commented: "I think that the Women's Movement was an unfinished revolution. We ended up joining the working world as defined by men and struggling to live on its terms. I think we got stuck in trying to live up to male-defined expectations. That world (including male-dominated governments) didn't (and still doesn't) take into account the fact that babies or small children need very personal one-to-one care. Because we were so determined to escape domesticity, I think we feminists had a bit of a blind spot around children’s emotional needs and ignored this uncomfortable fact."

Other books by Sue Gerhardt include The Selfish Society.

== See also ==
- Attachment theory
- John Bowlby
- Pre- and perinatal psychology
- Continuum concept
- Primal therapy
