= David Gerdes =

Astrophysicist and professor at Case Western Reserve University

- Born: 1964 (age 61–62); Worcester, Massachusetts
- Occupations: University professor, astrophysicist
- Scientific career
- Education: Carleton College; University of Cambridge; University of Chicago
- Fields: Physics, Astronomy
- Institutions: Case Western Reserve University (2025-present); University of Michigan (1992–1995, 1998-2025); Johns Hopkins University (1996-1998)
- Thesis: Search for Wprime to e-nu and Wprime to mu-nu in pbar-p collisions at sqrt(s) = 1.8 TeV. (1992)
- Doctoral advisor: Melvyn Shochet
- Website: artsci.case.edu/about-the-college/about-the-dean/

David Gerdes (born 1964) is an American astrophysicist, professor, and dean of the College of Arts and Sciences at Case Western Reserve University. He is known for his research on trans-Neptunian objects, particularly for his discovery of the dwarf planet, 2014 UZ_{224}.

== Education ==
Gerdes is a native of Hudson, Ohio and graduated from Hudson High School in 1982. He completed his undergraduate education in physics at Carleton College in Northfield, Minnesota in 1986. From 1986 to 1987, he studied applied mathematics and theoretical physics at the University of Cambridge under a Churchill Scholarship. From 1987 to 1992, he studied at the University of Chicago, eventually obtaining a PhD in physics.

== Career ==
Upon completing his Ph.D., Gerdes joined the University of Michigan Physics Department in 1992 as a postdoctoral research fellow, working on the Collider Detector at Fermilab (CDF) experiment. From 1996 to 1998, he was an assistant professor of Physics and Astronomy at Johns Hopkins University. He returned to the University of Michigan Physics Department as a faculty member in 1998, and was promoted to professor in 2008. He served as department chair from 2019-2025. In March 2025 he became dean of the College of Arts and Sciences at Case Western Reserve University.

=== Johns Hopkins University ===
At Johns Hopkins University, Gerdes contributed to early studies of the top quark and to new particle searches with the Collider Detector at Fermilab. He received an Outstanding Junior Investigator Award from the United States Department of Energy and a CAREER Award from the National Science Foundation.

=== University of Michigan ===
In 1994, Gerdes and his collaborators on the Collider Detector at Fermilab experiment made the first observations of the top quark subatomic particle.

Using data collected from the Dark Energy Survey between 2013 and 2018, Gerdes led a team of physicists and students at the University of Michigan which discovered hundreds of new object in the Kuiper Belt, including a previously unknown dwarf planet. The dwarf planet was known informally as DeeDee until it was given its official designation of 2014 UZ_{224}. Gerdes helped to develop the camera used to make the discovery, although it was originally intended to create a map of distant galaxies.

Gerdes is currently involved in efforts to locate a theorized ninth planet in the Solar System. He expressed hope that the planet may have been captured in the same set of astronomical images that 2014 UZ_{224} was found in, and stated that he was "... excited about our chances of finding it." In 2021, Gerdes and graduate student Kevin Napier published a paper claiming that the clustering of extreme trans-Neptunian Objects, a key part of the evidence for Planet Nine, is simply an observational artifact and is not statistically significant.

== Awards and distinctions ==
- Asteroid 208117 Davidgerdes named by the International Astronomical Union.
- Fellow of the American Physical Society – awarded in 2015 for contributions in particle physics related to b-quark tagging.
- Provost's Teaching Innovation Prize – awarded in 2012 by the University of Michigan's Center for Research on Learning and Teaching for innovation in teaching.
- Arthur F. Thurnau Professorship—awarded in 2007 for outstanding contributions to undergraduate teaching.
- Lee G. Mabal Prize — awarded in 2009 for contributions to university research.
