= Gerardo Greco =

Italian journalist

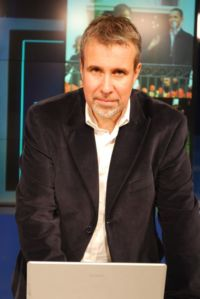
- Born: Maurizio Belpietro; 13 January 1966 (age 60); Rome, Italy
- Occupations: journalist, television presenter
- Height: 1.73 m (5 ft 8 in)

Gerardo Greco (born 13 January 1966) is an Italian journalist.

== Biography ==
Gerardo Greco graduated from LUISS Guido Carli university in Rome. He then went on to study at the school of Radio and Television Journalism in Perugia, Italy. He debuted in the 1990s as a news reporter following breaking news and Italian affairs. His work at this time is most characterized by the Tangentopoli scandal, a large-scale criminal investigation in the early 1990s against widespread corruption and bribery in Italian administrative, political, and business circles.

In 2001, he became the first North American correspondent for RAI in New York, and shortly afterward for the TG2 network. He assisted in covering the developing stories regarding the 11 September 2001 attacks. He has reported many notable breaking news stories in North America to Italy including that of the Bush presidency, the natural disaster incurred by Hurricane Katrina and the 2006–2008 Cuban transfer of presidential duties from Fidel Castro to his brother Raúl Castro.

== Publications ==
- Gerardo Greco "Good Morning AMERICA - Un viaggio sulle tracce del nuovo sogno americano", 2009, Sperling & Kupfer.
- Alessandra D'Asaro, Filippo Nanni, Gerardo Greco, “Sopravvivere al G8, la sfida dei ribelli al mercato mondiale", 2001, Editori Riuniti.
