= Klaus Gerhart =

American photographer

Klaus Gerhart is an American photographer and the owner of Uber Adventures, a canyoneering training provider. He was the owner of Pohlmann Press and the owner and curator of the N Gallery art gallery.

== Life ==
Born Klaus Gerhart in Illinois in 1965, Gerhart grew up there before moving to Chicago in 1992. He built a photography studio there, but moved to Los Angeles in 1994. He founded Pohlmann Press that same year, and began publishing the work of photographers of the male nude. Among the works the press carried were his own.

Pohlmann Press quickly became one of the largest American publishers of nude male photography. The company published the work of Lorenzo Gomez, Roy Dean, David Vance, Christopher Makos, Joe Ziolkowski, John Phillips, Catherine McIntyre, Nina Glaser, Patrick Sarfati, Dale O'Dell and Chuck Smith, and focused on Gerhart's own work. Pohlmann Press also handled American subscriptions to (not only) blue magazine, an Australian bimonthly magazine of photography which also featured male nudes and semi-nudes.

In 1995, Gerhart created the Naked Gallery—an art gallery but also a publisher of a catalog that specializes in the works of Pohlmann Press, artistic male and female nude imagery, books, calendars, lithographs, and original signed limited edition photographic prints.

== Art ==
Between 1995 and 1998, Gerhart published two books: Embracing Men and Men Two. Both books contained about 100 photographs. In 1997, Gerhart published Naked Angels. The following year, the German publisher Bruno Gmuender issued a pocket-sized, hardcover collection of Gerhart's works titled Edition Euros 13. The same year, Gerhart published Handsome Devils.

As Pohlmann Press expanded, Klaus Gerhart found less time for photography. Two years passed before Body Conscious was published. Echo followed a year later. Gerhart has not published any works since 2001. Pohlmann Press ceased publishing in 2001 as well.

Gerhart is a self-taught photographer. Much of his early development as an artist came during a period when single-lens reflex cameras (SLRs) and cameras with automatic metering and focusing were uncommon. His images often feature a wide range of grain, and he experiments extensively with exposure and fill lighting. Depth of field is an important aspect of his work, and soft focus is used only minimally.

== Books by Klaus Gerhart ==
- Embracing Men, Pohlmann Press, Los Angeles, 1995, ISBN 0-9642009-2-9
- Men Two, Pohlmann Press, Los Angeles, 1995, ISBN 0-9642009-1-0
- Naked Angels, Pohlmann Press, Los Angeles, 1997, ISBN 0-9642009-8-8
- Edition Euros 13, Bruno Gmuender Verlag, Berlin, 1998, ISBN 3-86187-118-1
- Handsome Devils, Pohlmann Press, Los Angeles, 1998, ISBN 1-890377-01-5
- Body Conscious, Pohlmann Press, Los Angeles, 1999, ISBN 1-890377-08-2
- Echo, Pohlmann Press, Los Angeles, 2001, ISBN 1-890377-07-4
