= Farrapos, Rio Grande do Sul =

Coordinates: 29°58′48″S 51°11′49″W

Farrapos (meaning Ragamuffins in English, in allusion to the Ragamuffin War) is a neighbourhood (bairro) in the city of Porto Alegre, the state capital of Rio Grande do Sul, in Brazil. It was created by Law 6218 from November 17, 1988.
