= Gerardi =

Gerardi is an Italian surname. Notable people with the surname include:

- Antonio Gerardi (born 1968), Italian actor and radio presenter
- Federico Gerardi (born 1987), Italian footballer
- Geronimo Gerardi (1595–1648), Flemish artist active in Italy
- Giulio Gerardi (1912–2001), Italian cross-country skier
- Juan José Gerardi Conedera (1922–1998), Guatemalan Roman Catholic bishop
- Kellie Gerardi (born 1989), American scientist and science communicator
- Pietro Paolo Gerardi (1633–1708), Italian Roman Catholic prelate
- Roberto Gerardi (1919–1995), Italian cinematographer
- Sheyene Gerardi, Venezuelan actress, producer, and media executive

== See also ==
- Gherardi, surname
- Gherardini, surname
- Ghirardi, surname
