= Gerrard Street =

Gerrard Street may refer to:

- Gerrard Street, London in London, United Kingdom
- Gerrard Street (Toronto) in Toronto, Canada
