= Guerard =

Guérard, and Guerard may refer to:

== Localities ==
- Guérard, in the Seine-et-Marne department of the Île-de-France region, north-central France
- Beuzeville-la-Guérard, in the Seine-Maritime department of the Haute-Normandie region, northern France
- Bosc-Guérard-Saint-Adrien, in the Seine-Maritime department of the Haute-Normandie region, northern France
- Templeux-le-Guérard, in the Somme department of the Picardie region, northern France
- Bosc-Guérard-Saint-Adrien, a commune in the Seine-Maritime department in the Haute-Normandie region, northern France

== People ==
- Albert J. Guerard (1914–2000), American academic and writer
- Albert Léon Guérard (1880–1959), French-born American academic, father of Albert J. Guerard
- Benjamin Guerard (1740–1788), American politician from South Carolina
- Benjamin Guérard (historian) (1797–1854), French historian and librarian
- Daniel Guérard (born 1974), Canadian ice hockey player
- Michel Guérard (1933–2024, Vétheuil, Val-d'Oise), French chef
- Guerard des Lauriers (1898–1988), French theologian and bishop
- Robert Guérard (1641–1715), French Benedictine scholar
- Stéphane Guérard (born 1968), Canadian ice hockey player

== See also ==
- Gérard
- Gerard
- Von Guerard (disambiguation)
