= Gerhard Tausche =

German archivist and author (born 1957)

- Born: 1957 (age 68–69); Landshut, West Germany
- Occupations: archivist and author

Gerhard Tausche (born 1957) is a German archivist and author.

He is head of the Stadtarchivs Landshut and chairman of the Historischen Vereins Niederbayern.

== Works ==
- Landshut, die altbayerische Residenzstadt an der Isar. Landshut 1999. ISBN 398065611X, ISBN 3-9806561-1-X
- Verwandlungen. 2001.
- Geschichte Landshuts. Mit Werner Ebermaier. ünchen 2003. ISBN 3406510485
- Von der Donau an die Isar. Vorlesungen zur Geschichte der Ludwig-Maximilians-Universität 1800–1826 in Landshut. edited by Latitia Boehm & Gerhard Tausche. Berlin 2003. ISBN 3428112261
- Reinhard Stauber, Gerhard Tausche and Richard Loibl: Niederbayerns reiche Herzöge. (Hefte zur bayerischen Geschichte und Kultur, Bd. 38). Augsburg 2009.
