= Gerard Flores =

Argentine singer, songwriter and actor

- Born: Gerardo Emanuel Flores; September 3, 1981 (age 44); Buenos Aires, Argentina
- Genres: Latin pop
- Occupations: Singer; songwriter; actor; producer
- Instruments: Vocals
- Years active: 2001–present
- Labels: Avarecords; Warner Music Group; GEF Productions
- Website: gerardflores.com

Gerardo Emanuel Flores (born September 3, 1981), known professionally as Gerard Flores, is a singer-songwriter, producer and actor from Buenos Aires, Argentina.

Gerard was part of the number one program in Argentina, Susana Gimenez, recording more than 300 episodes for two consecutive years, while in the United States, Gerard has been a part of From Dusk till Dawn: The Series, Harbinger and Just Living: The Series, which received several awards. In 2020, the artist decided to start his solo career and during this time he released six singles.

== Early life ==
Born and raised in Buenos Aires, Gerard is the youngest of two children. He developed an interest in acting and music at a very young age. Although he was quite shy, he always managed to be part of the school exhibitions. But it wasn't after finishing high school that he was allowed to follow his dream. Gerard was lucky enough to enroll in a very prestigious art school run by one of the most relevant singers in Argentina, Valeria Lynch. She was the one who gave him his first big chance to be a part of a musical.

== Television career ==
Back home, Gerard had a successful career across television, theater and music. He was a daily cast member of the highest rated TV show in Argentina, Susana Giménez, recording more than 300 episodes over the span of multiple years. By the time his contract finished with the show, he was recording an electronic tango album 'Gayres' with his duet group 'Kurdha' under Avarecords/Warner Chappell Music Argentina. Prior to his TV career, Gerard toured throughout Argentina as part of the musical 'Lucia la Maga', directed by the celebrated singer Valeria Lynch. After 'Lucia la Maga', he went on to star in six different musicals, each touring throughout Argentina and Latin America.

Gerard left Argentina to take his career to new heights in the US. This move gave him the opportunity to be part of prestigious projects like From Dusk till Dawn: The Series , Harbinger , My Secret Lake and many national and international commercials. Gerard has also written and produced his own Web-Series 'Just Living: The Web-Series', which was released on Prime Video and won multiple awards including 'Best Supporting Actor' and 'Best Director', awarded to Gerard Flores.

== Musical career ==
'Esta Noche' was the first promotional single of his debut solo album. Released on March 5, 2020, the single has received reviews from music critics like Billboard Argentina and PopSugar who praised his new sound and the energy on the song. Billboard editor wrote, "The song is a danceable track that catches you with it unique rhythms, which combines pop with EDM and a lyric that invites the listener to leave his or her problems aside to dance all night".

On August 20 of the same year and coming off the success of his debut single 'Esta Noche', Gerard released his first bilingual track, 'Lonely'. A unique fusion of pop, flamenco and reggaeton, 'Lonely' exudes sensuality and seduction. The theme of the song was inspired by the longing for human contact and while written before the COVID-19 pandemic, it was a very relevant and palpable message during 2020. “Despite our digital connectedness, people feel more alone than ever,” says Gerard. “The song celebrates the very human need to be together,” he added.

'Por Eso Te Amo', Gerard's third single, was released on December 3 of 2020. A romantic Ballad, full of feeling, with a story of a pure love that transcends the barriers of time, distance, culture and language. 'Por Eso Te Amo' music video expanded its parameters to include those with Hearing loss. Understanding that ballads can connect with audiences at a much deeper level, Gerard felt it was important that his new song be all inclusive and thus incorporated the written lyrics and Sign language to his music video. 'Por Eso Te Amo' music video was premiered on December 4 on one of the most prestigious morning shows in Latin America and USA called ¡Despierta América!, airing on Univision. The awareness Gerard brought to light about the lack of inclusivity in music videos, was covered extensively in the press. Billboard was one of them, once again, naming 'Por Eso Te Amo' one of the '5 Uplifting Moments in Latin Music of the Week (December 5, 2020)', Uforia Audio Network, People en Español, Los Angeles Times, Escuchaz.com, and Siempre Mujer were some of the media outlets that also supported 'Por Eso Te Amo' and its message of inclusivity. Gerard and his balad were also featured on 'En Casa con Telemundo' y 'Acceso Total', two of the most popular shows in Telemundo, where he also talked about bullying; a very personal topic and cause for him.

Gerard co-wrote 'Esta Noche', 'Lonely' and 'Por Eso Te Amo' with Swedish songwriter Aleena Gibson and Latin Grammy-winner producer and engineer Trevor Muzzy was at the helm of the EP production.

== Artistry ==
Gerard possesses the vocal range of a tenor. Gerard's work was influenced by his idol, Cher, but also by big stars like Ricky Martin, Jennifer Lopez, and Madonna. According to Gerard, his first crush was the singer and actress Thalía. He has even stated that her live performances were a huge motivation for him to follow a career in entertainment. Chayanne is also another artist that has influenced Gerard's work since the beginning of his career and it's not a casualty that the press has started to see him as his successor. PopSugar editor wrote, "He could definitely be a younger Chayanne — not that there's anything wrong with 50-year-old Chayanne. He definitely brings a distinct, fresh sound that fuses different sub genres of Latin music in a way that connects across cultural lines and language".

== Filmography ==
=== Film ===
Year	Title	Role	Notes
2015	Harbinger	Kitty	US Film debut
2016	Pasadena	Nathan Finley	Lead role
2018	My Secret Lake	Cristian	Lead role Prime Video
2020	Urges	Carlos	Lead role (Release TBD)

=== Television ===
Year	Title	Role	Notes
2007-08	Susana Giménez	Dandy/Groom	Seasons 20 and 21 Telefe
2015	American Crime	Call center employee	Episode Eleven (S1:E11)
2015	From Dusk till Dawn: The Series	Scrawny Drifter	Episodes: "The Last Temptation of Richard Gecko" (S2:E8) and "There Will Be Blood"(S2:E9)
2017	Just Living: The Series	Gustavo	Recurring Prime Video
2019	A Merry Christmas Match	Francisco	Hallmark Channel Original Movie

== Discography ==
=== Studio albums ===
- 2009: Gayres

=== Singles ===
- 2020: Esta Noche
- 2020: Lonely
- 2020: Por Eso Te Amo

== Awards ==
- Best Supporting Actor for “Just Living: The Series” at The Actors Awards in L.A. (2017)
- Best First Time Director for “Just Living: The Series” at Los Angeles Film Awards in L.A. (2017)
- Best Director for “Just Living: The Series” at L.A. Shorts Awards in L.A. (2017)
- Best Vocalist at the Fresh Fruit Festival in NYC. (2014)
