= Paul Gerhardt Jr. =

American architect (1899–1966)

- Born: January 23, 1899; Cook County, Illinois, United States
- Died: October 11, 1966 (aged 67); Cook County, Illinois, United States
- Occupation: Architect

Paul Gerhardt Jr. (January 23, 1899 – October 11, 1966) was an American architect who lived and worked in Illinois, United States. Gerhardt was a graduate of Yale University. His father Paul Gerhardt Sr. had been Chicago city architect, to which position Gerhardt Jr. succeeded in 1929, serving until his death in 1966. He designed city branch library buildings, police stations, fire stations, and bridges. Among his landmark projects was the Art Deco Chicago Municipal Airport Terminal, finished in 1947.
