= Gerhard =

Gerhard is a name of Germanic origin and may refer to:

== Given name ==
- Gerhard (bishop of Passau) (fl. 932–946), German prelate
- Gerhard III, Count of Holstein-Rendsburg (1292–1340), German prince, regent of Denmark
- Gerhard Allroggen (1936–2025), German musicologist
- Gerhard Barkhorn (1919–1983), German World War II flying ace
- Gerhard Berger (born 1959), Austrian racing driver
- Gerhard Boldt (1918–1981), German soldier and writer
- Gerhard de Beer (born 1994), South African football player
- Gerhard Diephuis (1817–1892), Dutch jurist
- Gerhard Domagk (1895–1964), German pathologist and bacteriologist and Nobel Laureate
- Gerhard Dorn (c.1530–1584), Flemish philosopher, translator, alchemist, physician and bibliophile
- Gerhard Ertl (born 1936), German physicist and Nobel Laureate
- Gerhard Fieseler (1896–1987), German World War I flying ace
- Gerhard Flesch (1909–1948), German Nazi Gestapo and SS officer executed for war crimes
- Gerhard Gentzen (1909–1945), German mathematician and logician
- Gerhard Armauer Hansen (1841–1912), Norwegian physician who found the cause of leprosy
- Gerhard Herzberg (1904–1999), German-Canadian physicist and chemist and Nobel Laureate
- Gerhard Hochschild (1915–2010), German-American mathematician
- Gerhard Klimeck (born 1966), German-American scientist
- Gerhard Kretschmar (1939–1939), German child authorized for euthanasia by Adolf Hitler
- Gerhard Kuska, (born 1966), former U.S. government official
- Gerhard Lang (1924–2016), German botanist
- Gerhard Lenski (1924–2015), American sociologist of German descent
- Gerhard Löwen (1868–1938), Swedish diplomat
- Gerhard Mayer (born 1980), Austrian discus thrower
- Gerhard A. Meinl (1957–2026), German instrument maker and politician
- Gerhard Mitter (1935–1969), German racing driver
- Gerd Müller (1945–2021), German football striker
- Gerhard Friedrich Müller (1705–1783), German historian and ethnologist
- Gerhard Ludwig Müller (born 1947), German cardinal
- Gerhard Munthe (1849–1929), Norwegian painter and illustrator
- Gerhard Narholz (born 1937), Austrian-American composer
- Gerhard Neumann (1917–1997), aircraft engine designer and executive
- Gerhard Noodt (1647–1725), Dutch jurist
- Gerhard Jan Palthe (1681–1767), Dutch painter and portraitist
- Gerhard Potma (1967–2006), Dutch competitive sailor
- Gerhard Präsent (born 1957), Austrian composer
- Gerhard Richter (born 1932), German expressionist painter
- Gerhard Ritter (1888–1967), German nationalist-conservative historian
- Gerhard Rohlfs (1892–1986), German linguist
- Gerhard von Scharnhorst (1755–1813), German general
- Gerhard Schmidhuber (1894–1945), German general during World War II
- Gerhard Schröder (born 1944), German SDP politician, former Chancellor of Germany
- Gerhard Schröder (CDU) (1910–1989), German CDU politician, Foreign Minister and Minister of Defence
- Gerhard Schwedes (born 1938), American football player
- Gerhard von Schwerin (1899–1980), German general during World War II
- Gerhard Sommer (1921–2019), German soldier during World War II accused of war crimes
- Gerhard Sommer (pilot) (1919–1944), German World War II flying ace
- Gerhard Strindlund (1890–1957), Swedish politician
- Gerhard Struber (born 1977), Austrian association football manager
- Gerhard Tausche (born 1957), German archivist and author
- Gerhard Trabert (born 1956), German public figure
- Gerhard Wack (born 1945), German politician
- Gerhard Wolf (1896–1971), German diplomat who saved many Jews from the World War II Holocaust
- Gerhard Zandberg (born 1983), South African swimmer

== Surname ==
- Friedrich Gerhard (1884–1950), German equestrian and Olympic champion
- Friedrich Wilhelm Eduard Gerhard (1795–1867), German archaeologist
- Hubert Gerhard (c. 1540/1550–1620), Dutch sculptor
- Johann Gerhard (1582–1637), German religious leader and theologian
- Karl Gerhard (1891–1964), Swedish theater director, revue writer and actor
- Keegan Gerhard (born 1960), German pastry chef
- Mark Gerhard, CEO of Jagex from 2009 to 2015
- Peter Gerhard (1920–2006), American historical geographer
- Roberto Gerhard (1896–1970), Spanish Catalan composer, musical scholar and writer
- Till Gerhard (born 1971), German painter

== Pseudonym or professional name ==
- Wolfgang Gerhard, post-World War II alias of German war criminal Josef Mengele (1911–1979)
- Gerhard (cartoonist) (born 1959), Canadian illustrator and comics artist

== See also ==
- Gerard
- Gérard
- Gerhardt
- Gerhart
