= Saint Gerald =

Saint Gerald may refer to:

- Gerald of Aurillac celebrated on October 13
- Gerald of Braga celebrated on December 5
- Gerald of Mayo celebrated on March 13
- Gerald of Sauve-Majeure celebrated on April 5
- Gerald of Toul celebrated on April 23
