= Jacob Gerritsz. Loef =

Dutch Golden Age marine painter

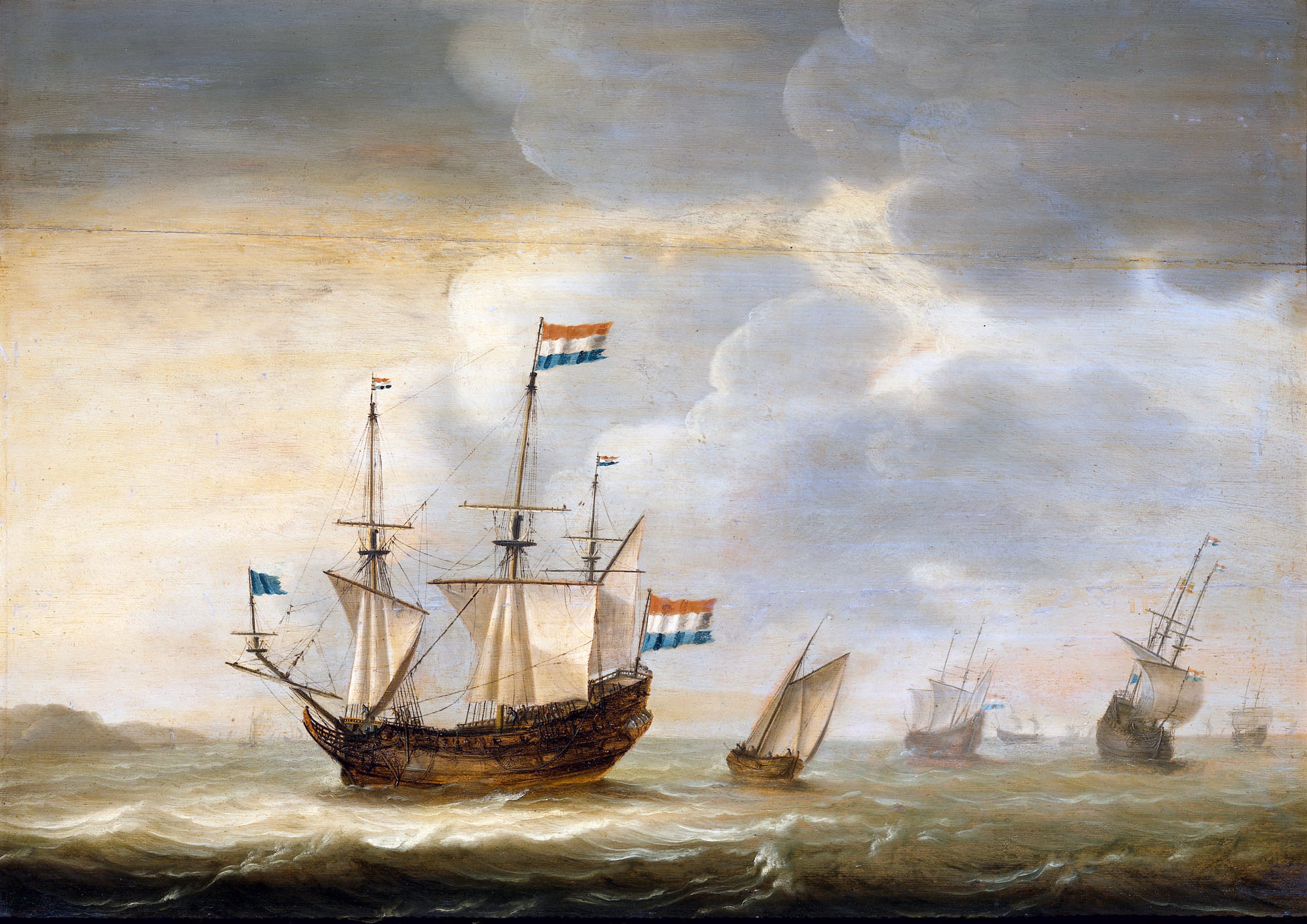
Ships sailing along a coast, 1670

Jacob Gerritszoon (Note: Abbreviated Gerritsz.) Loef (1605/1607 – 1683/1685), was a Dutch Golden Age marine painter.

He was born and died in Enkhuizen and worked there and in nearby Hoorn. According to the RKD he is known for his marines and Gerrit Pompe was his pupil. He signed his works with the monogram IGL.
