= Gérard of Brogne =

Abbot of Brogne (885-959)

Saint Gérard of Brogne
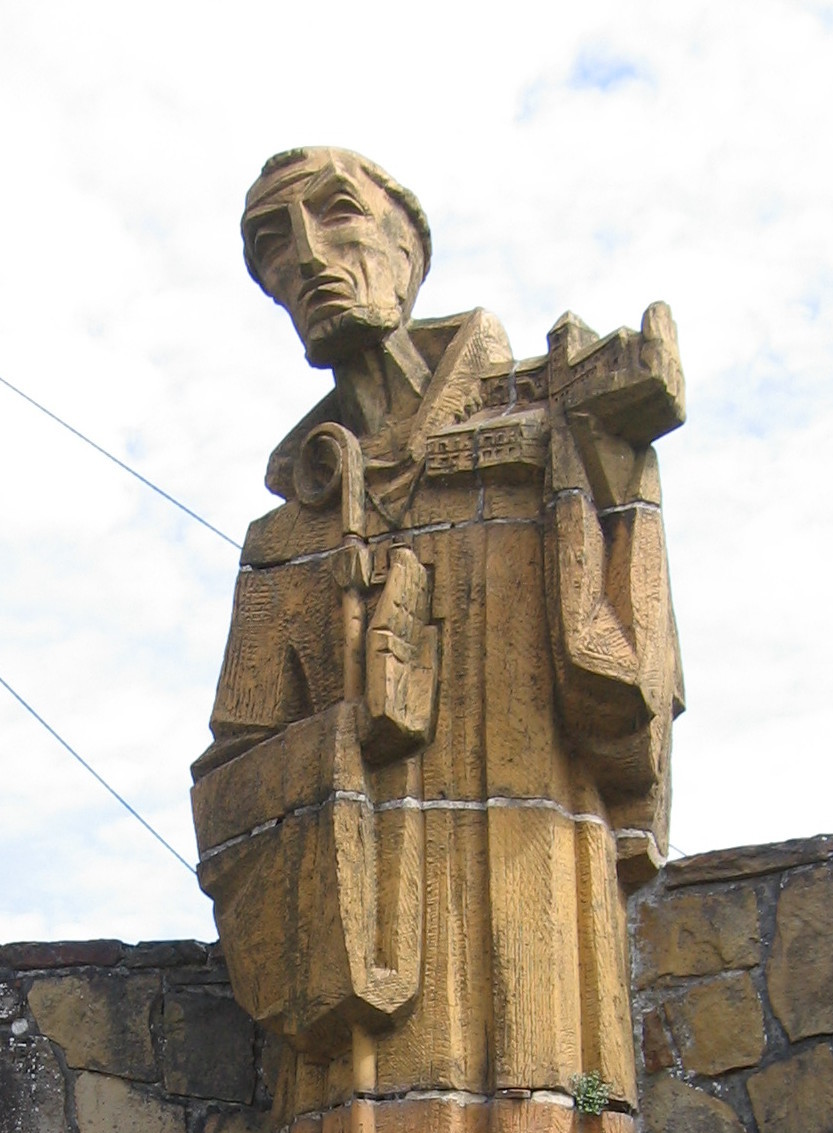
- Statue of Saint Gerard, behind which stands the church of Saint-Gérard.
- Born: ~895
- Died: October 3, 959
- Venerated in: Roman Catholic Church
- Major shrine: Saint-Gérard, Namur
- Feast: October 3
- Patronage: Saint-Gérard, Namur

Saint Gérard (in Walloon Sint-Djuråd) (c. 895 – October 3, 959) founded Brogne Abbey and reformed eighteen others according to the Benedictine Rule.

== Life ==
Gérard was born at Staves (Namur). His father was Stance, a member of the family of dukes of Lower Austrasia. His mother was Plectrude, sister of Bishop Stephen of Liège. Originally a soldier, he rebuilt a family chapel into a large church staffed by canons.

About 917, while in Paris on business, he happened to stay at the Abbey of St-Denis. He was so impressed with the life of the monks that he decided to join them. Having arranged his affairs, he became a monk, yet still kept an interest in the church at Brogne. The abbot of Saint-Denis gave him a relic of St Eugenius Brogne for the community there. A charter of 923 granted land in Hesbaye to the church at Brogne. Around 928, Gérard was ordained a priest. He returned to Brogne, where he eventually replaced the lax clerics there with monks. He then retired to a cell near the monastery for a stricter way of life.

The Archbishop of Cambrai asked him to reform the community of Saint-Ghislain in Hainault where he again replaced the canons with monks. He eventually became head of eighteen other abbeys in the region of present-day Belgium, where he enforced strict monastic discipline. When he reformed the Abbey of Saint Bertin in 944, dissident monks fled to King Edmund I of England. Towards the end of his life, he placed vicars or abbots in his stead, in the various abbeys with which he was charged. He traveled to Rome to obtain a papal bull to confirm the privileges of Brogne Abbey. On his return he paid a final visit to all the communities which he had reorganized, and then retired to Brogne where he died in October 959. Brogne was later renamed Saint-Gerard Abbey.

== Veneration ==
The saint's feast day is celebrated in the dioceses of Namur, Ghent, and Liege on October 3, for which he is listed in the Roman Martyrology.

Relics, considered authentic, are preserved at Saint-Gérard, the abbey of Maredsous, Aubange, and Ghent (in the church of Notre-Dame).
