= Quirijn van Brekelenkam =

Dutch Baroque genre painter

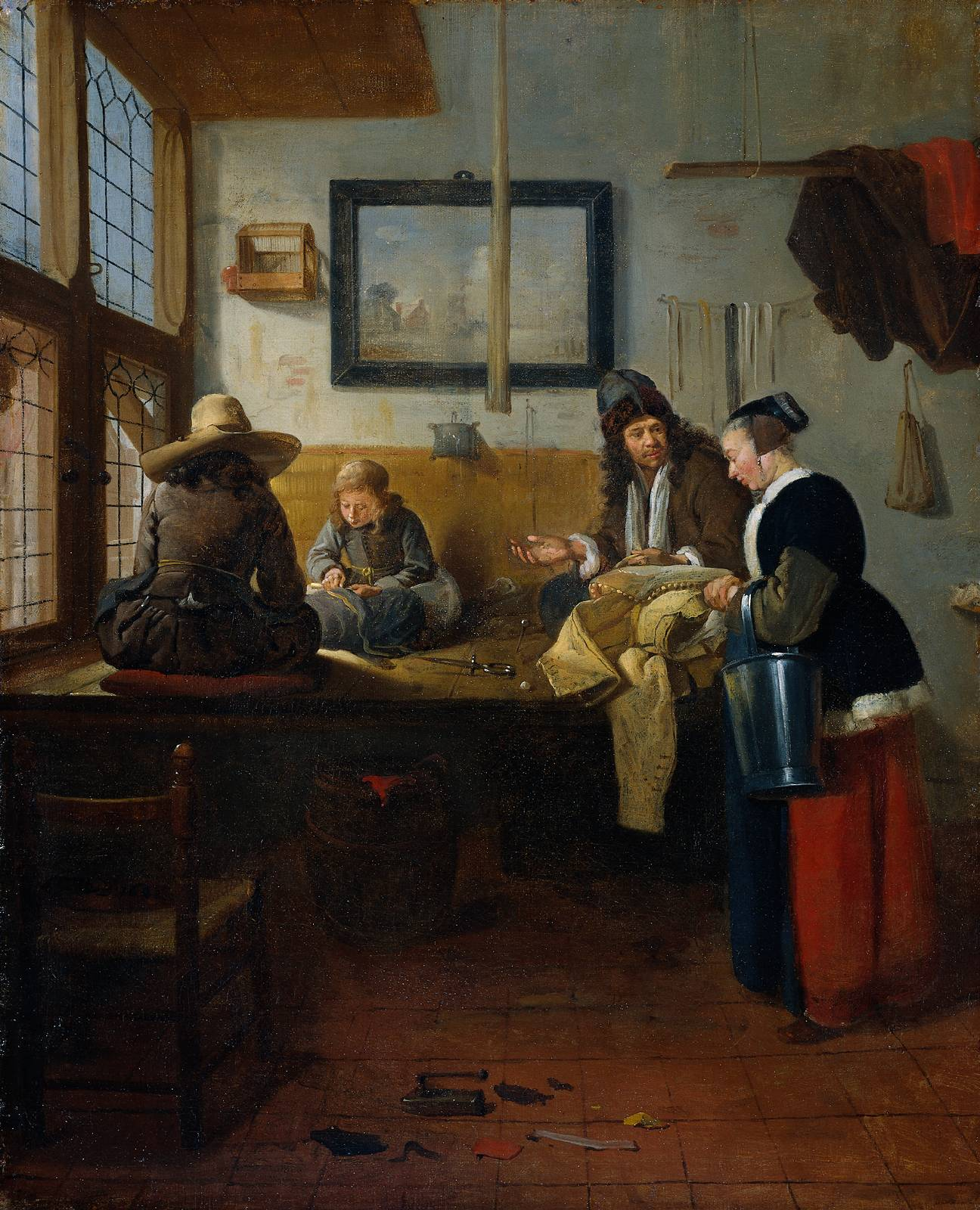
Quirijn van Brekelenkam, The Tailor's Workshop, 1661.

Quirijn or Quiringh Gerritsz van Brekelenkam (1622/29, Zwammerdam – 1669/79, Leiden) was a Dutch Baroque genre painter. He probably studied under Gerard Dou, and as a result his paintings from the 1640s and 1650s are similar to those of the Leiden fijnschilders.

== Life and work ==
There is not much certainty about his life. Because his sister Aeltgen was born in Zwammerdam, it is assumed that Quiringh was also born there. In a census from 1622 in Zwammerdam is the name Van Brekelenkam not mentioned which is why he was probably born after this year. Incidentally, Aeltgen was married to Johannes van Oudenrogge, a painter of farmhouse and stable interiors.

Brekelenkam married on April 11, 1648 with Marie Jans Charle. The couple had six kids, but his wife died after the birth of their last child in 1655. On 5 September 1656, Van Brekelenkam remarried Elisabeth van Beaumont. They had three children together.

The first date known for Brekelenkam is 18 March 1648, the date on which he registered with the Guild of Saint Luke in Leiden. Concerning his annual payment to the guild, he was mentioned from 1648 until 1650 and from 1658 until 1667. His earliest known painting dates from 1648, while the last known painting by him, De goudweger, dates from 1668. He probably died around 1669.
