= Cornelis Gerritsz Decker =

Dutch painter (1618–1678)

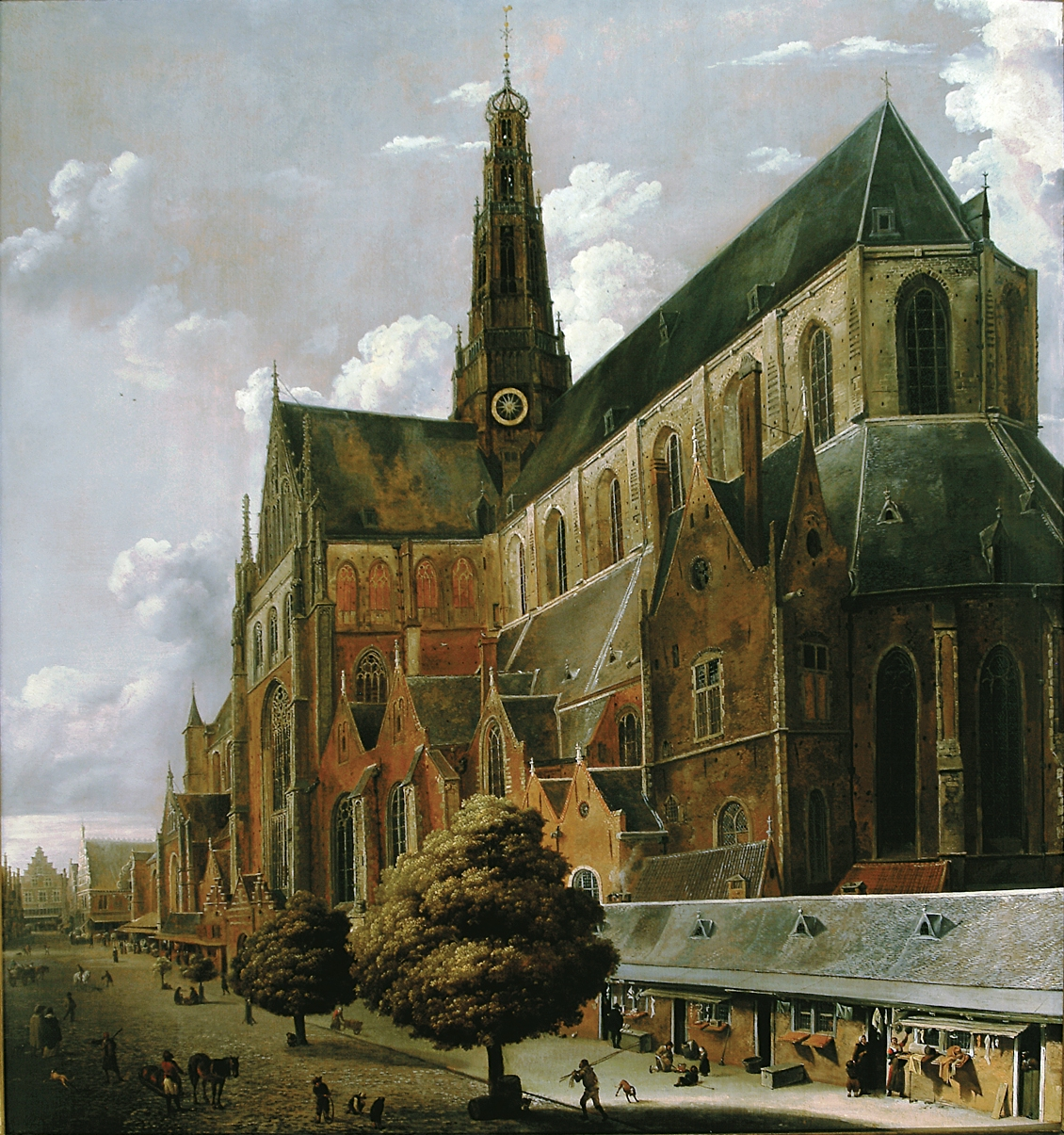
The St. Bavochurch in Haarlem seen from the south side on the Oude Groenmarkt, 1658, Frans Hals Museum

Cornelis Gerritsz Decker (1618, Haarlem – 1678, Haarlem), was a Dutch Golden Age landscape painter.

== Life ==
He was possibly a relation of David Decker, who was registered in the Haarlem guild as a pupil of Gerrit Claesz Bleker in Haarlem in 1640. David Decker's only known artwork was formerly attributed to Cornelis and shows strong similarity with his work.

Cornelis Gerritsz Decker became a member of the Haarlem Guild of St. Luke in 1643.

== Work ==
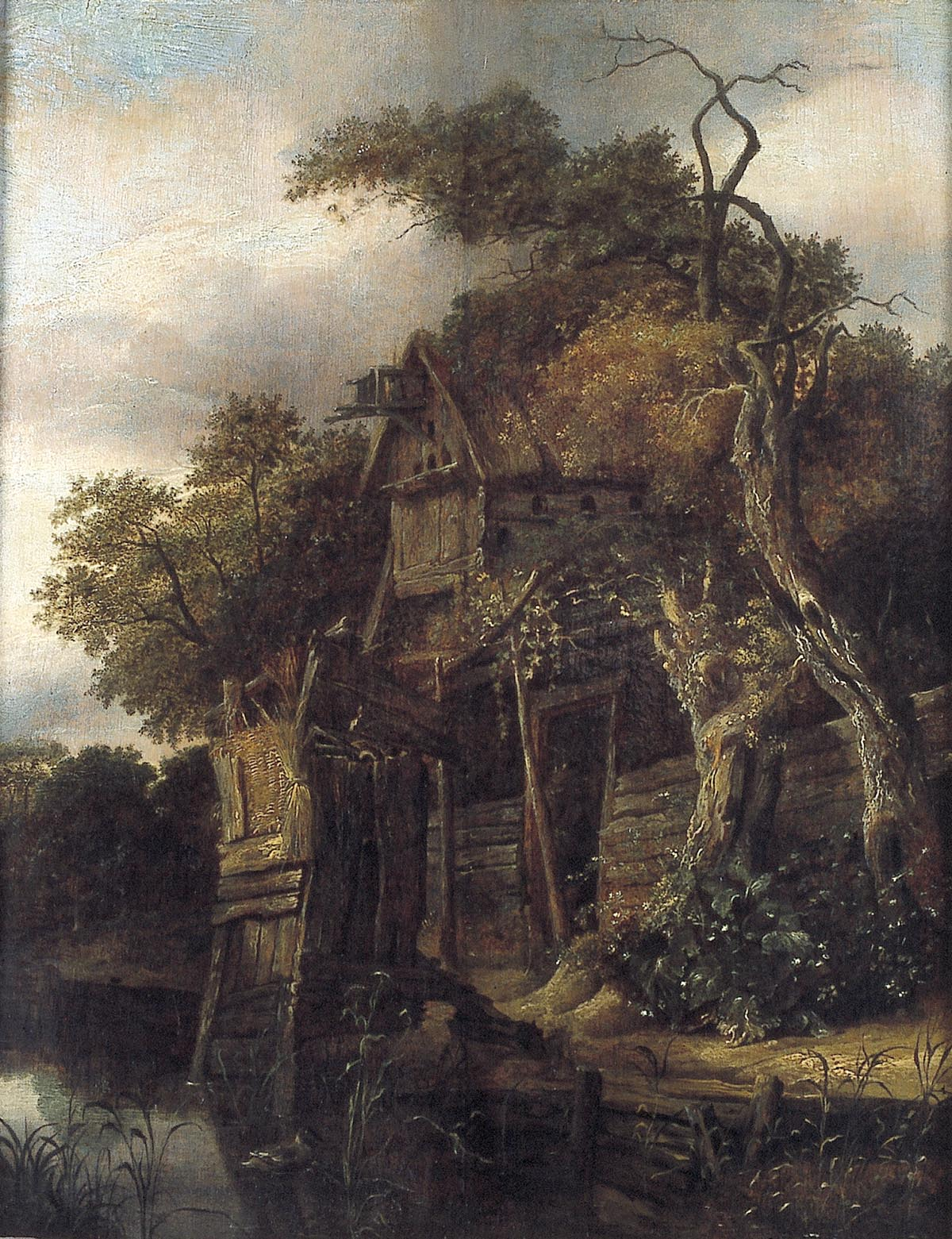
Wooden shed by a stream.

He painted landscapes in the manner of Jacob van Ruisdael. Some of the staffage in his landscapes was painted by Adriaen van Ostade, Philips Wouwerman and Johannes Lingelbach.

== Links ==
- 12 artworks by or after Cornelis Gerritsz Decker at the Art UK site
- Cornelis Gerritsz Decker on Artnet
