= Stephen of Liège =

Frankish churchman (c. 850–920)

Stephen of Liège (also Étienne de Liège; (c. 850 – 16 May 920) was a Frankish churchman who was the bishop of Liège from 901 until his death in 920. He was a hagiographer and composer of church music. His surviving compositions include three Proper Offices for the Office of the Trinity, the Office of the Invention of St Stephen and the Office of St Lambert. Like the Offices of his contemporary Hucbald, Stephen's compositions follow the eight modes, though the musicologist Yves Chartier does not consider this innovation, asserting that both composers "did no more than to apply openly a manner of composition that was prevalent in their milieu."

== Life and career ==
Stephen was born in the Low Countries around 850. In Metz he attended cathedral school and later went to the Aachen's palace school in 864. Following his education, Stephen attained numerous church posts: he became an abbot of St Evre, St Mihiel and Lobbes as well as a canon of Metz Cathedral. He was elected bishop of Liège in 901, holding the post until his death in Liége on 16 May 920.

His works include In Festi Sanctisissimae Trinitatis, an office for the feast of the Trinity. The celebration of the Feast of the Holy Trinity is attributed to him.

== Recording ==
- Etienne de Liège. In festo sanctissimae trinitatis. Psallentes. RIC 249

== Sources ==
- Chartier, Yves (1995). L'oeuvre musicale d'Hucbald de Saint-Amand: les compositions et le traité de musique. Montréal: Bellarmin. pp. 38–39. ISBN 978-2-89007-732-4.
- Huglo, Michel (2001a). "Stephen of Liège". Grove Music Online. Oxford: Oxford University Press. doi:10.1093/gmo/9781561592630.article.26706. (subscription, Wikilibrary access, or UK public library membership required)
