= Gerritsen =

Gerritsen is a Dutch patronymic surname "son of Gerrit". It is particularly common in the province of Gelderland. Variations on this name include Gerritse, Gerrits, Garritsen and Gerretse(n). Notable people with the surname include:

- Alida Gerritsen-de Vries (1914–2007), Dutch sprinter
- Annette Gerritsen (born 1985), Dutch speed skater
- Carel Victor Gerritsen, (1850–1905), Dutch radical politician and feminist
- Jim Gerritsen, American organic farmer and trade unionist
- Esther Gerritsen (born 1972), Dutch writer
- Lisa Gerritsen (born "Orszag" 1957), American actor
- Maico Gerritsen (born 1986), Dutch footballer
- Marcel Gerritsen (born 1967), Dutch cyclist
- Margot Gerritsen, American engineer
- Mees Gerritsen (born 1939), Dutch cyclist
- Patrick Gerritsen (born 1987), Dutch footballer
- Paul Gerritsen (born 1984), New Zealand rower
- Rinus Gerritsen (born 1946), Dutch bassist
- Rupert Gerritsen (1953–2013), Australian historian
- Tess Gerritsen (born 1953), American novelist
- Tim Gerritsen, American video game producer and designer
- Wendy Gerritsen (born 1972), Dutch cricketer

Gerrits

- Antonie Gerrits (1885–1969), Dutch cyclist
- Evelien Gerrits (born 1985), Dutch cricketer
- Travis Gerrits (born 1991), Canadian freestyle skier

Gerritse

- Willem Wouter Gerritse (born 1983), Dutch water polo player

Garritsen

- Margaret Garritsen de Vries (1922–2009), American IMF economist and historian
- Martijn Garritsen (born 1996), Dutch DJ better known as Mar+in Garri×
- Nel Garritsen (1933–2014), Dutch swimmer

== See also ==
- Gerritszoon
- Gerritsen Beach, Brooklyn and Gerritsen Creek, a New York City neighborhood and watercourse named after the Dutch settler Wolphert Gerretse
