= Gerd (given name) =

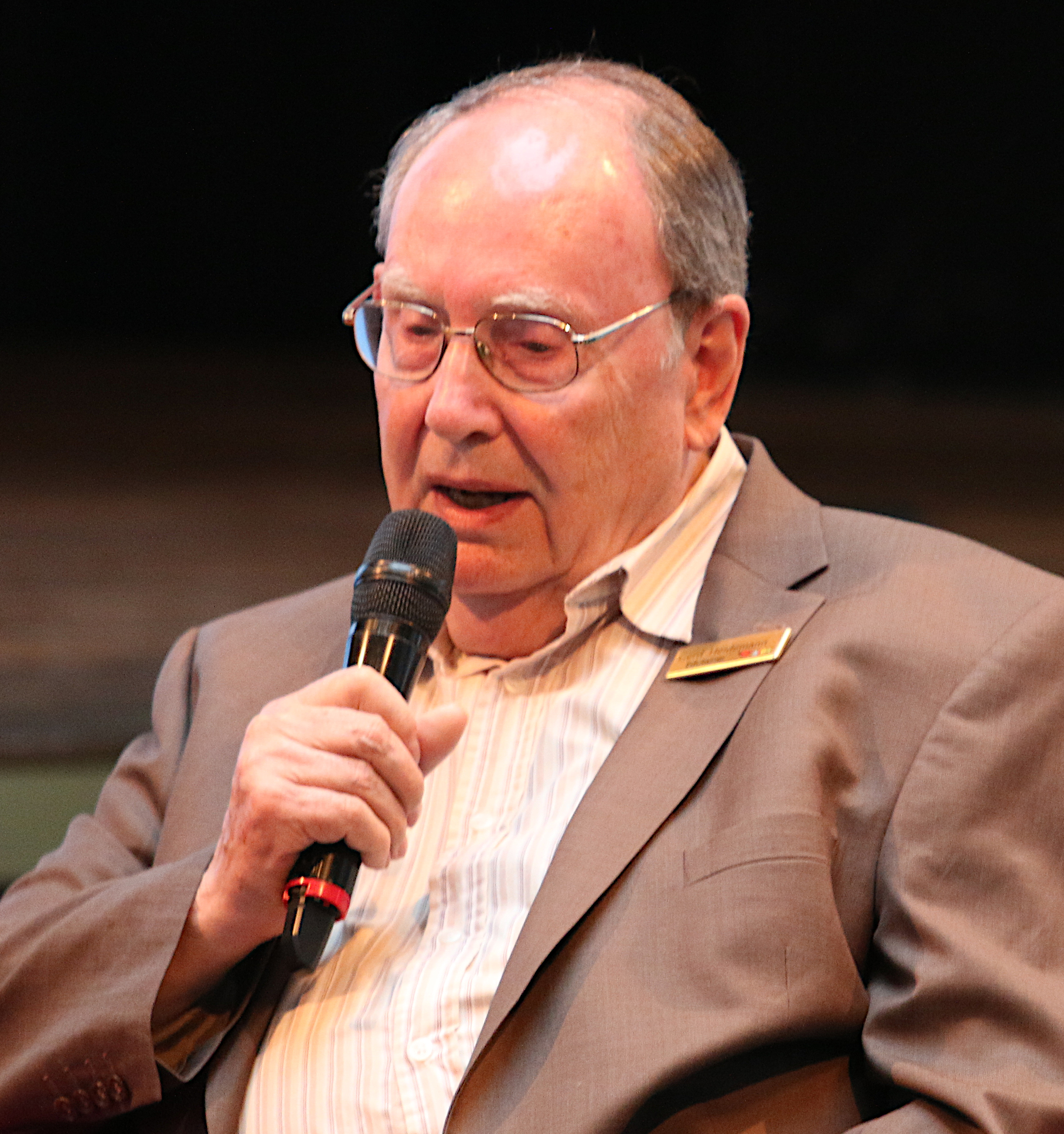
- Gerd Heidemann
- Gender: Unisex

Origin
- Origin: Germanic

Other names
- Related names: Gerhard, Gerhardt, Gerhardus, Geert, Gert, Gertje, Gherardo, Girard, Guérard, Gehr

Gerd is a common Germanic name and a unisex given name. As a masculine name (most common in German-speaking countries) it is a shortened form of Gerhard and Gerardus. As a feminine name (most common in Scandinavia) it may be a form of Gerda or Gertrud, or a modern form of Old Norse Gerðr. See also Gert.

Notable people with this name include:

== Men ==
- Gerd B. Achenbach (born 1947), German philosopher
- Gerd Achgelis (1908–1991), German aviator and test pilot
- Gerd Achterberg (1940–2025), German football manager
- Gerd Albrecht (1935–2014), German conductor
- Gerd Andres (born 1951), German politician
- Gerd Aretz (1930–2009), German artist
- Gerd Arntz (1900–1988), German artist
- Gerd Audehm (born 1968), German former professional cyclist
- Gerd Bachmann (born 1943), German wrestler
- Gerd Backhaus (born 1942), German football player
- Gerhard Barkhorn (1919–1983), German World War II flying ace
- Gerd Baltus (1932–2019), German television actor
- Gerd Becker (chemist) (1940–2017), German chemist
- Gerd Becker (handballer) (born 1953), German handball player
- Gerd Binnig (born 1947), German physicist
- Gerd Böckmann (born 1944), German actor
- Gerd Boder (1933–1992), German composer
- Gerd Bohner (born 1959), professor of social psychology
- Gerd Bohnsack (born 1939), German football player and manager
- Gerd Bollmann (1947–2017), German politician
- Gerd Bonk (1951–2014), weightlifter
- Gerd Brenneis (1930–2003), German operatic tenor
- Gerd Briese (1897–1957), German actor
- Gerd vom Bruch (born 1941), German football player and coach
- Gerd Bucerius (1906–1995), German politician, publisher, and journalist
- Gerd Buchdahl (1914–2001)
- Gerd Buschhorn (1934–2010), German physicist
- Gerd Cintl (1938–2017), West German rower
- Gerd Dais (born 1963), German football player
- Gerd Domhardt (1945–1997), German composer
- Gerd Dörich (born 1968), German racing cyclist
- Gerd Dose (1942–2010), German literature and culture professor
- Gerd Dudek (1938–2022), German jazz tenor saxophonist, soprano saxophonist, clarinetist, and flautist
- Gerd Dudenhöffer (born 1949), German cabaret artist
- Gerd Egger (born 1943), German judoka
- Gerd Faltings (born 1954), German mathematician
- Gerd Frähmcke (born 1950), German middle-distance runner
- Gerd Frick (born 1974), Italian mountain runner
- Gerd Frickhöffer (1913–1980), German actor
- Gerd Geerling (born 1965), German surgeon and professor
- Gerd Gies (born 1943), German politician
- Gerd Gigerenzer (born 1947), German psychologist
- Gerd F. Glang, NOAA Corps rear admiral
- Gerd Grabher (born 1953), Austrian football referee
- Gerd Gradwohl (born 1960), German paralympic alpine skier
- Gerd Greune (1949–2012), German politician
- Gerd Grochowski (1956–2017), German operatic bass-baritone
- Gerd Gruber (born 1982), Austrian ice hockey defenceman
- Gerd Hahn (born 1981), German economist and professor
- Gerd Hatje (1915–2007), German publisher
- Gerd Haxhiu (born 1972), Albanian football coach
- Gerd Heßler (born 1948), East German cross-country skier
- Gerd Heidemann (1931–2024), German journalist
- Gerd Heinrich (1896–1984), German entomologist and ornithologist
- Gerd Heinz (born 1940), German actor and stage director
- Gerd Hennig (1935–2017), German football referee
- Gerd Heßler (born 1948), East German cross-country skier
- Gerd Heusch (born 1955), German physician, physiologist, and professor
- Gerd Hirzinger (born 1945), German roboticist
- Gerd Honsik (1941–2018), Austrian writer and lyric poet
- Gerd Hornberger (1910–1988), German sprinter
- Gerd Jendraschek, German linguist
- Gerd Jüttemann (1933–2023), German psychologist
- Gerd Kanter (born 1979), Estonian discus thrower
- Gerd Kehrer (born 1939), German painter
- Gerd Kische (born 1951), German football player
- Gerd Kühr (born 1952), Austrian conductor and composer
- Gerd Leers (born 1951), Dutch politician
- Gerd Leufert (1914–1998), German Empire-born Venezuelan painter, photographer
- Gerd E. Mäuser (born 1958), German businessman
- Gerd Michael Henneberg (1922–2011), German actor and theater director
- Gerd Mischke (1920–1992), German military commander
- Gerd Müller (1945–2021), German football player
- Gerd Müller (politician) (born 1955), German politician
- Gerd B. Müller (born 1953), Austrian theoretical biologist
- Gerd Nagel (born 1957), German high jumper
- Gerd Oswald (1919–1989), American film director
- Gerd R. Puin (born 1940), German orientalist
- Gerd Riss (born 1965), German speedway rider
- Gerd Roggensack (1941–2024), German football player and manager
- Gerd Ruge (1928–2021), German journalist, author and filmmaker
- Gerd Ruge (soldier) (1913–1997), German military commander
- Gerd von Rundstedt (1875–1953), German World War II field marshal
- Gerd Saborowski (born 1943), German football player
- Gerd Schädlich (1952–2022), German footballer
- Gerd Schönfelder (born 1970), German para-alpine skier
- Gerd Schwidrowski (born 1947), German footballer
- Gerd Siegmund (born 1973), German ski jumper
- Gerd Springer (1927–1999), Austrian footballer and coach
- Gerd Strack (1955–2020), German football player
- Gerd Tacke (1906–1997), German businessman
- Gerd Theissen (born 1943), German theologian
- Gerd Türk, German tenor
- Gerd Völs (1909–1991), German rower
- Gerd Wessig (born 1959), East German high jumper
- Gerd Zimmermann (footballer) (1949–2022), German football player
- Gerd Zimmermann (speed skater) (born 1942), German speed skater

== Women ==
- Gerd Andersson (born 1932), Swedish actress
- Gerd Barkman, shooting competitor for New Zealand
- Gerd Benneche (1913–2003), Norwegian jurist, journalist, non-fiction writer, and politician
- Gerd Kjellaug Berge (born 1943), Norwegian hotelier
- Gerd Brantenberg (born 1941), Norwegian author, teacher, and feminist writer
- Gerd Dvergsdal (born 1946), Norwegian politician
- Gerd Enequist (1903–1989) Swedish geographer
- Gerd Fleischer (born 1942), Norwegian human rights activist
- Gerd Grieg (1895–1988), Norwegian actress
- Gerd Grønvold Saue (1930–2022), Norwegian journalist, literary critic, novelist, hymnwriter, and peace activist
- Gerd Grubb (born 1939), Danish mathematician
- Gerd Gudding (1951–2015), Norwegian musician
- Gerd Hagman (1919–2011), Swedish actress
- Gerd Hegnell (born 1935), Swedish actress
- Gerd Janne Kristoffersen (born 1952), Norwegian politician
- Gerd Larsen (1921–2001), Norwegian-British ballerina
- Gerd Neggo (1891–1974), Estonian dancer and choreographer
- Gerd Søraa (1934–2018), Norwegian writer and politician

== Fictional characters ==
- Gerd Frentzen, a character in the Japanese anime Blassreiter
- Gerd, the doctor of the New Giant Warrior Pirates in the Japanese anime One Piece
- Hauptmann Gerd Wiesler, code name HGW XX/7, Stasi officer and central character of The Lives of Others

== Lists of people ==
- Gerd Becker (disambiguation)
- Gerd Müller (disambiguation)
- Gerd Zimmermann (disambiguation)

== See also ==
- Gerd (disambiguation)
