= Gerling (surname) =

Gerling is a German language surname. Such as the related Gehrig, Gehring, Gering and Gehr it belongs to the group of family names derived from given names – in this case from any of several compound names of Germanic origin with the beginning element ger (e. g. Gerhardt, Gerhold, Gerald, Gerwin, Gerd or Gernot) – and may refer to:

- Christian Ludwig Gerling (1788–1864), German physicist and astronomer
- Gordon D. Gerling (1921–2016), American businessman and politician
- Hans Gerling (1915–1991), German businessman
- Klaas Gerling (born 1981), German DJ and producer
- Rolf Gerling (born 1954), German businessman
