= Gehr =

Gehr is a German language surname. Such as the related Gehrig, Gehring, Gering and Gerling it belongs to the group of family names derived from given names – in this case from any of several compound names of Germanic origin with the beginning element ger (e. g. Gerhardt, Gerhold, Gerald, Gerwin, Gerd or Gernot) – and may refer to:

- Ernie Gehr (born 1941), American experimental filmmaker
- Ferdinand Gehr (1896–1996), Swiss painter
- Herbert Gehr (1911–1983), Jewish American photographer and television director
- Mary Gehr (1913–1997), American painter and printmaker
