= Gerardus =

Gerardus is a Latinized version of the Germanic name Gerard. It has been in use as a birth name in the Low Countries. In daily life, most people use a shorter version, such as Geert, Ger, Gerard, Gerd, Gerhard, Gerrie, Gerrit, Gert, and Geurt. Among people with this name are:

Latinized names

- Gerardus de Abbatisvilla (1220–1272), French theologian
- Gerardus Bruxellensis, 13th-century Belgian geometer and philosopher
- Gerardus Cameracensis (c.975–1051), Belgian bishop of Cambrai
- Gerardus Cremonensis (c.1114–1187), Italian translator of scientific books
- Gerardus Mercator (1512–1594), Netherlandish cartographer, geographer and cosmographer
- Gerardus Odonis (1285–1349), French theologian and Minister General of the Franciscan Order
- Gerardus Rivius (fl. 1592–1625), Flemish printer
- Gerardus Rufus Vacariensis (1500–1550), French Catholic theologian and humanist
- Gerardus a Schagen (c.1642–1724), Dutch engraver and cartographer
- Gerardus Vossius (1577–1649), Dutch classical scholar and theologian
- Gerardus de Zutphania (1367–1398), Dutch mystical writer

Birth names

- Gerardus Pieter Baerends (1916–1999), Dutch zoologist and ethologist
- Gerardus Beekman (1653–1723), New Netherland physician, land owner, and colonial governor of New York
- Gerardus Johannes Berenschot (1887–1941), Commander-in-Chief of the Royal Netherlands East Indies Army
- Gerardus Leonardus Blasius (1627–1682), Dutch physician and anatomist
- Gerardus J.P.J. Bolland (1854–1922), Dutch linguist, philosopher, biblical scholar, and lecturer
- Gerardus Petrus Booms (1822–1897), Dutch lieutenant-general, Minister of War, and publisher
- Gerardus Brackx (1931–2011), Belgian travel businessman
- Gerardus J.M. Braks (1933–2017), Dutch government minister and President of the Senate
- Gerardus H.G. von Brucken Fock (1859–1935), Dutch pianist and composer
- Gerardus Meinardus Bruggink (1917–2005), Dutch Air Force pilot during World War II
- Gerardus Clark (1786–1860), American lawyer
- Gerardus Antonius Cox (born 1940), Dutch singer, cabaret artist and actor
- Gerardus Croese (1642–1710), Dutch Reformed minister and author
- Gerardus Johannes Geers (1891–1965), Dutch linguist and Hispanist
- Gerardus Gul (1847–1920), Dutch Archbishop
- Gerardus Philippus Helders (1905–2013), Dutch politician, Minister of Colonial Affairs
- Gerardus Heymans (1857–1930), Dutch philosopher and psychologist
- Gerardus 't Hooft (born 1946), Dutch theoretical physicist and Nobel Laureate
- Gerardus Huysmans (1902–1948), Dutch government minister
- Gerardus Kamper (1950–2026), Dutch cyclist
- Gerardus Johannes Lap (1951–2017), Dutch ceramist
- Gerardus B.M. Leers (born 1951), Dutch government minister and mayor
- Gerardus van der Leeuw (1890–1950), Dutch historian and philosopher of religion
- Gerardus Mes (fl. 1560), Flemish composer
- Gerardus Mühren (1946–2013), Dutch footballer
- Gerardus Johannes Mulder (1802–1880), Dutch organic and analytical chemist
- Gerardus Rubens (1674–1736), Flemish Cistercian abbot
- Gerardus Cornelius Schoffelen (born 1937), Dutch sculptor
- Gerardus Siderius (1914–1990), Dutch canoeist
- Gerardus J. Sizoo (1900–1994), Dutch physicist
- Gerardus van Swieten (1700–1772), Dutch-Austrian physician
- Gerardus Franciscus Tebroke (1949–1995), Dutch long-distance runner
- Gerardus B.M.C. Thoolen (1943–1996), Dutch stage and film actor
- Gerardus M.J. Veldkamp (1921–1990), Dutch economists and government minister
- Gerardus Petrus Voorting (1923–2015), Dutch road cyclist
- Gerardus de Vries Lentsch (1883–1973), Dutch competitive sailor
- Gerardus Maria Willems (born 1946), Dutch-born Australian classical pianist
- Gerardus Wynkoop II (died 1812), Pennsylvania politician
- Gerardus Josephus Xavery (1700–aft.1747), Flemish-Dutch etcher and painter

== See also ==
- Gerhardus
