= Iatmul =

Iatmul refer to:

- Iatmul people
- Iatmul language
