= Gehring =

Gehring is a German surname.

The patronymic surname was formed from the Germanic first name Gero ("the spear") and the suffix -ing means "belonging to" - belonging to the clan, family or house of Gero.

Notable people with the surname include:

- Christian Gehring (born 1979), German politician
- Franz Gehring (1838–1884), German writer on music
- Frederic Gehring (1903–1998), American Catholic priest and military chaplain
- Frederick Gehring (1925–2012), American mathematician
- Georg Gehring (1903–1943), German Olympic wrestler
- Gillian Gehring (born 1941), British physicist
- Henry Gehring (1881–1912), American Major League Baseball pitcher
- Hanni Gehring (1926–2011), German cross-country skier
- Kai Gehring (born 1977), German politician
- Kai Gehring (footballer) (born 1988), German footballer
- Lana Gehring (born 1990), American short track speed skater
- Mary Gehring, American plant biologist and epigeneticist
- Rolf Gehring (born 1955), German tennis player
- Ted Gehring (1929–2000), American actor
- Viktor Gehring (1889–1978), German actor
- Walter Jakob Gehring (1939–2014), Swiss developmental biologist
- William Gehring (born 1962), American psychologist and academic

== See also ==
- Gehring Clinic, a historic house and medical facility in Bethel, Maine, on the National Register of Historic Places
- Gehrig (surname)
- Gering (surname)
