= Gird =

Gird may refer to:

- Gird, India, region of the Madhya Pradesh state in central India
- Gird, Iran, village in the East Azerbaijan Province, Iran
- Gird (geometry), also known as the great rhombidodecahedron, a nonconvex uniform polyhedron, indexed as U73
- GIRD (Group for the Study of Reactive Motion), former Soviet research bureau founded in 1931 to study various aspects of rocketry

== See also ==
- Gerd (disambiguation)
- Gurd (disambiguation)
