= North Rhine-Westphalian Academy of Sciences, Humanities and the Arts =

German academy of sciences

- Nordrhein-Westfälische Akademie der Wissenschaften und der Künste
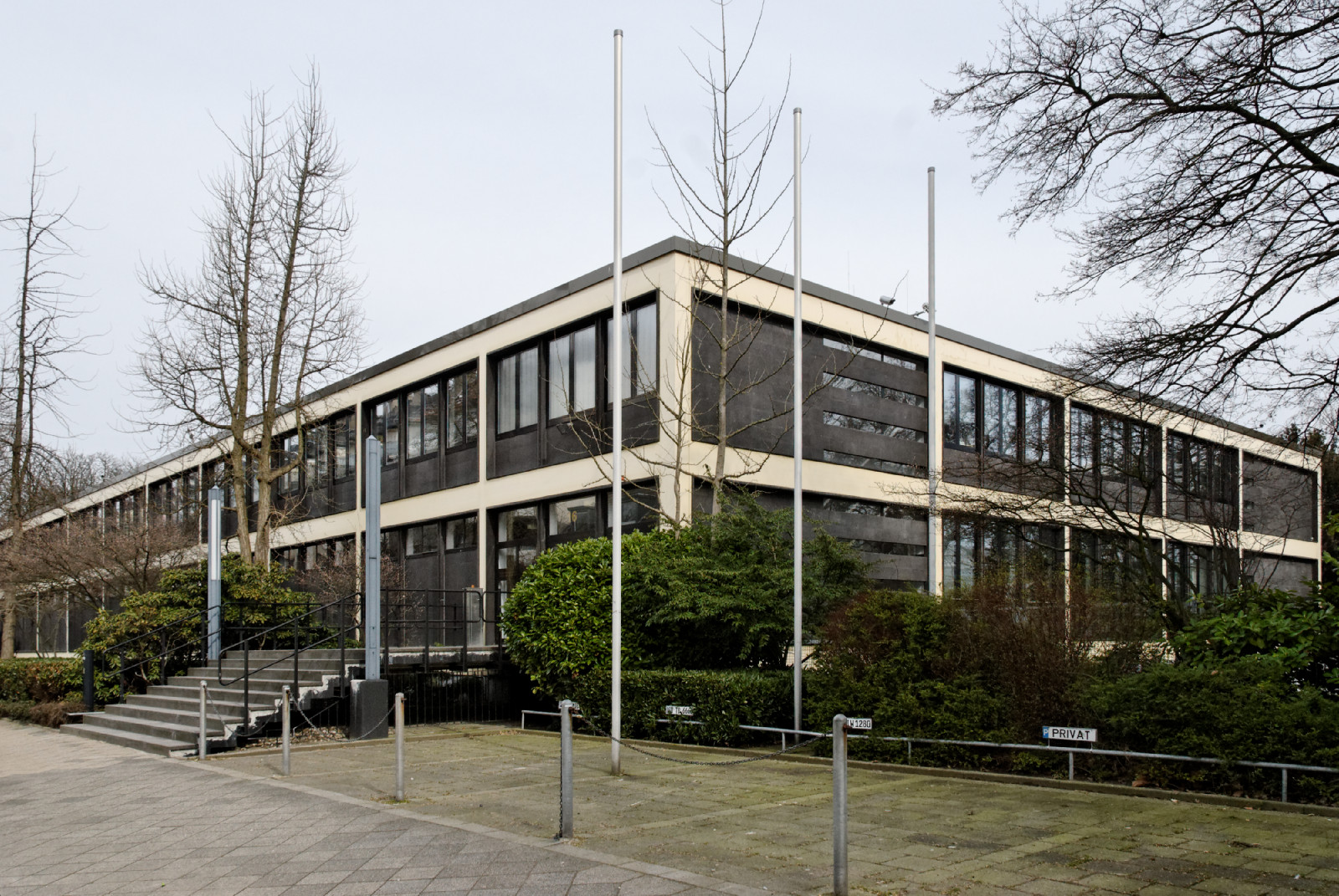
- Seat of the Academy: the Karl Arnold House (2011)
- Established: 1970
- President: Gerd Heusch
- Location: Düsseldorf
- Website: http://www.awk.nrw.de/
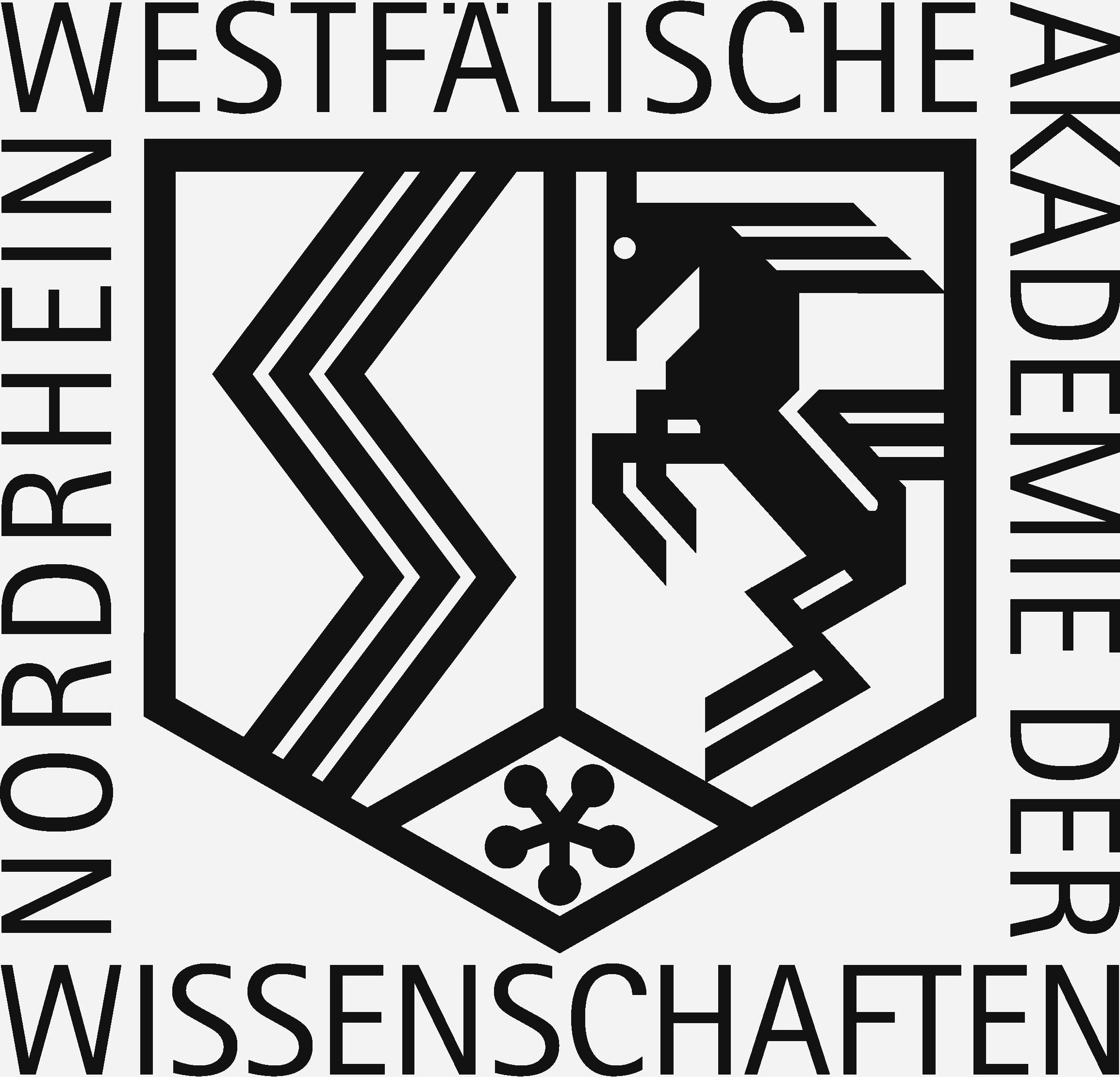

The North Rhine-Westphalia Academy for Sciences, Humanities and the Arts (German: Nordrhein-Westfälische Akademie der Wissenschaften und der Künste), shortly known as NRW is a learned society in Düsseldorf, North Rhine-Westphalia. With more than 280 members the academy is the biggest humanities project in Germany. It has been noted as "an important part of the scientific landscape" of Germany, through bringing together outstanding academic personalities under one roof.

== History ==
The academy was founded in 1970, as the successor of the "Association for Research of North-Rhine-Westphalia", which was initiated by the former Prime Minister Karl Arnold in 1950. In 1970 it was renamed to the "Rhine-Westphalian Academy of Sciences". From 1993 until 2008 it was called "North-Rhine-Westphalian Academy of Sciences".

== Purpose ==
The aim and purpose of this consolidation of the natural and technical sciences was to scientifically advise the government of North-Rhine-Westphalia during the post-war reconstruction. The construction of the Karl-Arnold-House in Düsseldorf in 1960 gave the association its own building in which it could fulfil its tasks.

== Members ==
The academy has around 280 full members and almost 130 corresponding members who foster scientific dialog and exchange with research and cultural institutions in Germany and abroad.

=== President ===
As of January 22, 2025 Gerd Heusch was elected president of the Academy, by Ina Brandes, the State Minister of Science and Culture of North Rhine-Westphalia. Succeeding Julia Bolles-Wilson who was in turn elected in 2022. Election of Heusch was applauded by Bundestag member Hermann Gröhe, who called the election "the truly deserved appreciation of an outstanding scientist in the country, whose advice and assessments were always important."

== Literature ==
- Löwer, Wolfgang; Dusch, Christiane (2020). 50 Jahre akademisches Gespräch. doi:10.30965/9783657760893. ISBN 978-3-657-76089-3.
