= Gerd Becker =

Gerd Becker may refer to:

- Gerd Becker (handballer) (born 1953), former West German handball player
- Gerd Becker (chemist) (1940–2017), German chemist
