= Samuel A. Lewis =

Samuel A. Lewis (1831 – May 31, 1913) was an American politician and philanthropist.

== Biography ==
Samuel A. Lewis was born in London in 1831. He engaged in business from an early age, and was so successful that he retired with a competency in 1862. In 1868 he was elected a member of the New York City Board of Education, serving as school commissioner and chairman of the financial committee. When in 1869 the legislature changed the board from elective to appointive, Lewis was confirmed in his office of school commissioner, and in 1870 was reappointed for a term of five years. In 1871, however, he was compelled to retire. One of his first acts as a school commissioner was to abolish corporal punishment. In 1874, Lewis was elected alderman at large, and later in the same year president of the aldermanic board, holding the presidency for two consecutive terms.

Lewis was one of the founders of the Mount Sinai Hospital, and served, since its organization in 1852, on its board of management as secretary, director, and vice-president, resigning the last-named office in 1873. He founded (1872) the School-Teachers' Life Assurance Society, and was in 1874 chairman of the relief association for the Ninth Ward. In 1851, the Ladies' Benevolent Society presented him with a gold medal in acknowledgment of the valuable aid he had rendered that body. From 1868 to 1873 Lewis was a trustee of the College of the City of New York.

He died in Greenwich, Connecticut on May 31, 1913.
