= Gerd =

Gerd or GERD may refer to:

== People, characters, figures ==
- Gerd (given name), a list of people with the given name or nickname
- Gerðr, sometimes modernly anglicized as Gerd or Gerth, the wife of the Norse god Freyr

=== Surnamed ===
- Irma Gerd (born 1989), Canadian drag queen

== Places ==
- Gerd (moon), a moon of planet Saturn
- Gerd Tholi (Gerd Hills), a range of hills on planet Venus
- Gerd Island, South Orkney Islands, Antarctica
- Grand Ethiopian Renaissance Dam, Benishangul-Gumuz Region, Ethiopia

== Other uses ==
- Gastroesophageal reflux disease, a chronic symptom of mucosal damage caused by stomach acid coming up from the stomach into the esophagus
- $G= e_R \, D$ : in radiation efficiency
- General Electric Research Laboratory, Schenectady, New York State, USA; formerly the General Electric Research and Development Center (GE R&D) that later spawned the research division of GE
- Die Gerd-Show, German satirical radio show

== See also ==
- George Gerds, cricket player
- Gird (disambiguation)
- Gurd (disambiguation)
