= Gurd =

Gurd may refer to:

- Gurd, Iran, a village in Gilan Province, Iran
- Gyrd and Gnupa, Danish kings
- Gurd, a member of the Ginyu Force in the manga Dragon Ball and its anime adaptation Dragon Ball Z

== See also ==
- Gerd (disambiguation)
- Gird (disambiguation)
