= Institute for International Assistance and Solidarity =

The Institute for International Assistance and Solidarity (IFIAS) is an international non-governmental organization with headquarters in Brussels, Belgium, working for the promotion of democracy, transparency and human rights.

It was registered under Belgian law as a non-profit organization in 1997, but its roots date from the late 1970s in Germany: There it was found in Bonn by former German chancellor Willy Brandt and Gerd Greune in 1979 to support democratic forces and establish exchange with civil society in the countries of the Warsaw Pact.

After the fall of the Iron Curtain, IFIAS created networks and conducted projects to help the former communist countries in their transition to democracy and pluralism, which provisionally culminated with the admission of ten new members to the European Union on May 1, 2004.

Besides that, IFIAS was active in the field of humanitarian aid during and following the civil wars in the Balkans. Especially in Germany, IFIAS organized fund-raising and transports of humanitarian aid goods to the conflict region as well as assisting and counseling refugees. In addition to that, IFIAS conducted projects in Chechnya, both for humanitarian aid and democratization (due to the political situation, this work could not be continued). In recent years, the focus of IFIAS' work has also shifted towards media projects and the protection of the freedom of speech in former communist countries.

Besides the headquarters in Brussels, IFIAS has offices in Bonn and Berlin (Germany), and in Belgrade (Serbia & Montenegro).
