= Panel for Educational Policy of the New York City Department of Education =

Governing body of the New York City Department of Education

Panel for Educational Policy of the Department of Education of the City School District of the City of New York
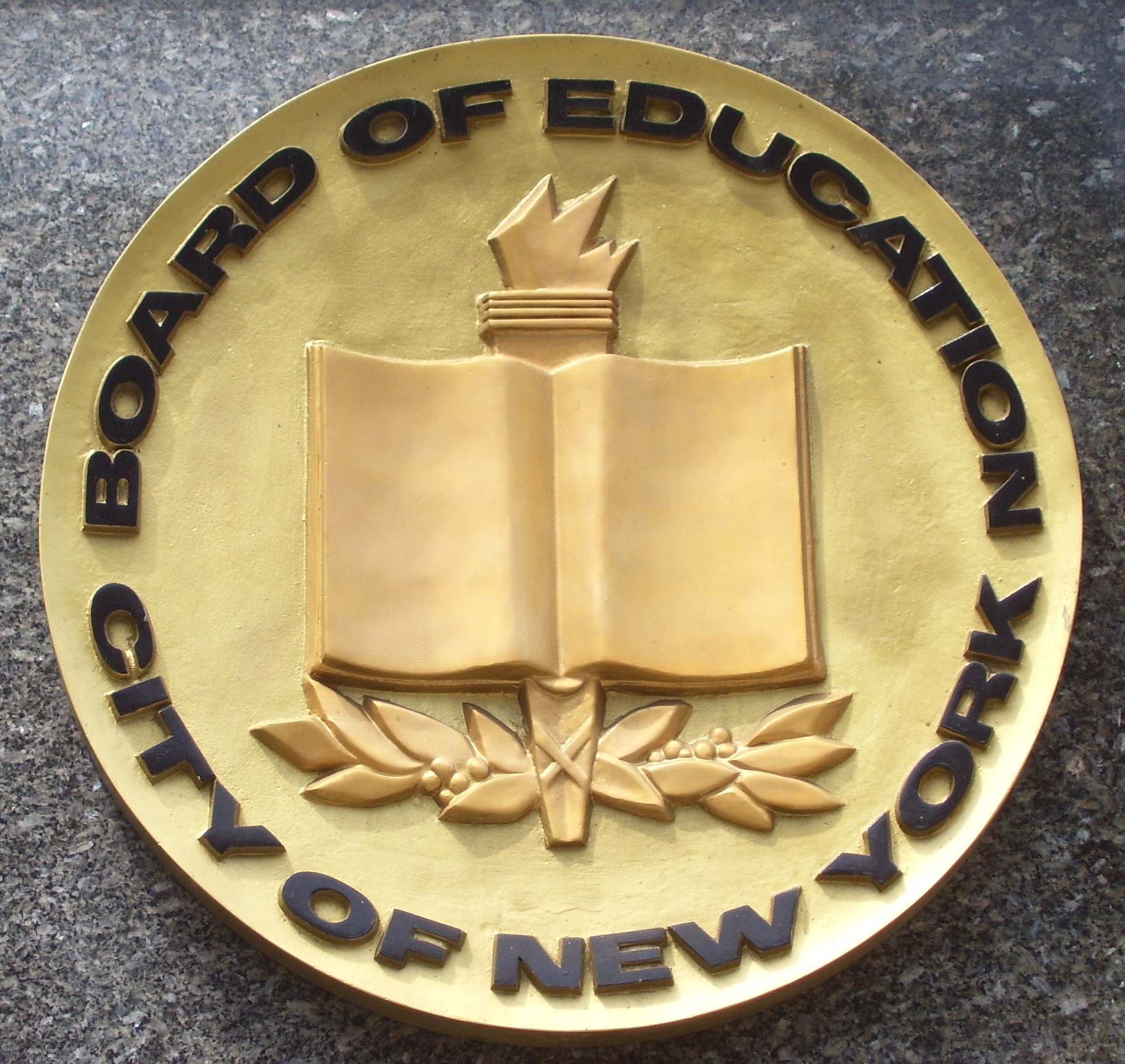
- Former seal of the Board of Education

Board overview
- Preceding board: New York City Board of Education
- Jurisdiction: New York City
- Headquarters: Tweed Courthouse
- Parent department: New York City Department of Education
- Key document: Bylaws of the Panel
- Website: Panel for Educational Policy

The Panel for Educational Policy of the Department of Education of the City School District of the City of New York (abbreviated as the Panel for Educational Policy and also known as the New York City Board of Education) is the governing body of the New York City Department of Education. The panel consists of 23 voting members: 13 appointed by the city mayor, 5 appointed by the five borough presidents with one each, and 5 appointed by the five borough's community education council presidents with one each.

== History ==
=== Mayoral Control (2002–present) ===
On June 30, 2002, Mayor Bloomberg secured authority over the schools from the New York State legislature, which began the era of "mayoral control" over the city schools. The New York Supreme Court elaborates:

By chapter 91 of the Laws of 2002, the Education Law was amended so as to radically restructure the governance of the school district of the City of New York. The amendment provided, among other things, that the Mayor of New York was empowered to appoint a Chancellor who would preside over a Board of Education which was to be expanded from 7 to 13 members, the majority of which were also to be appointed by the Mayor of the City of New York. Five Board members are selected by the Borough Presidents. Although that legislation itself made no specific reference to a "Department of Education of the City of New York," the bylaws subsequently adopted by the Board provide that this 13-member body "shall be known as the Panel for Educational Policy," which together with the Chancellor and other school employees is designated as the "Department of Education of the City of New York."

On June 30, 2009, the New York State Senate declined to renew the mayor's full authority over the school system. In particular, State Senate Democratic leader John Sampson, of Brooklyn, opposed the extension of mayoral control. The authority reverted for a time to the Board of Education, but mayoral control was restored until 2015 in a vote on August 6, 2009.

On January 29, 2021, two days after the January 27, 2021 panel meeting, Borough President James Oddo pulled Peter Calandrella, the Staten Island Representative to the Panel for Educational Policy, who was appointed to back in 2016, due to the fact that Mr. Calandrella voted against a contract extension for the administration of the controversial City Gifted & Talented exam. The borough president's statement mentioned the removal of Peter Calandrella was "not because of the substance of the vote, but because it went against what he, his staff and Calandrella had agreed on the night before". A letter from the entire panel was sent to Borough President Oddo requesting him to change his decision to remove Peter Calandrella from the PEP, however the removal was scheduled to be conducted on February 9, 2021. On March 9, 2021, it was announced that Borough President Oddo had appointed Jaclyn Tacoronte, a local business owner, to replace Peter Calandrella.

== Analysis and criticism ==
In 2011, Panel for Educational Policy member Patrick Sullivan (who was appointed by then Manhattan Borough President Scott Stringer in 2007) suggested changing the system to have only six mayoral appointees, and that appointees should have fixed terms; additionally, he stated "For us not to have the same role in our kids' education as people who live in the suburbs or Middle America is patronizing."

== See also ==
- Samuel A. Lewis, elected a member in 1868
- Gerardus Clark, former president
- History of education in New York City
