= Gerd Zimmermann =

Gerd Zimmermann or Gerhard Zimmermann may refer to:

- Gerd Zimmermann (speed skater) (born 1942), German speed skater
- Gerd Zimmermann (footballer) (1949–2022), German football player
