= Iatmul people =

Ethnicity in Papua New Guinea

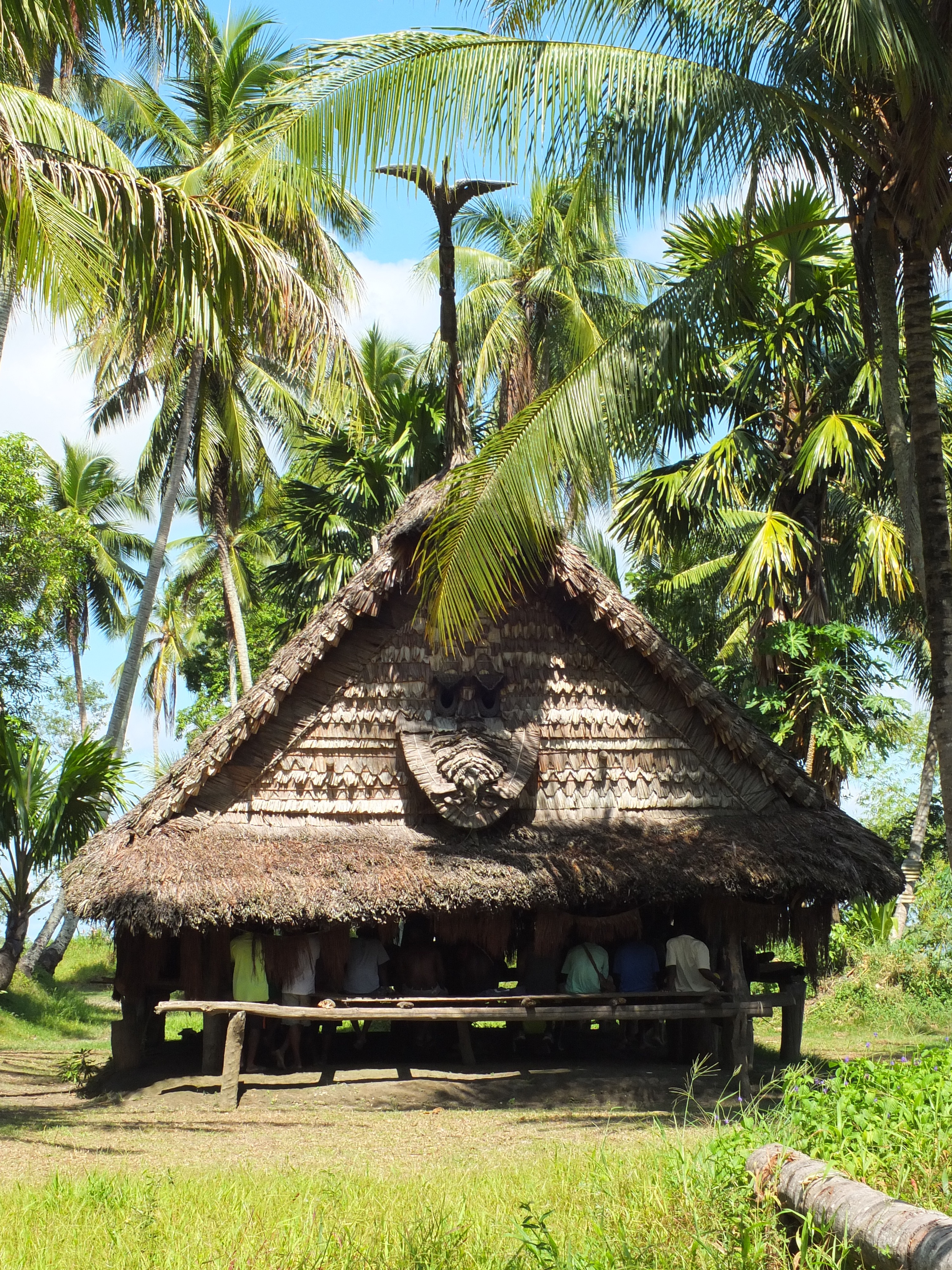

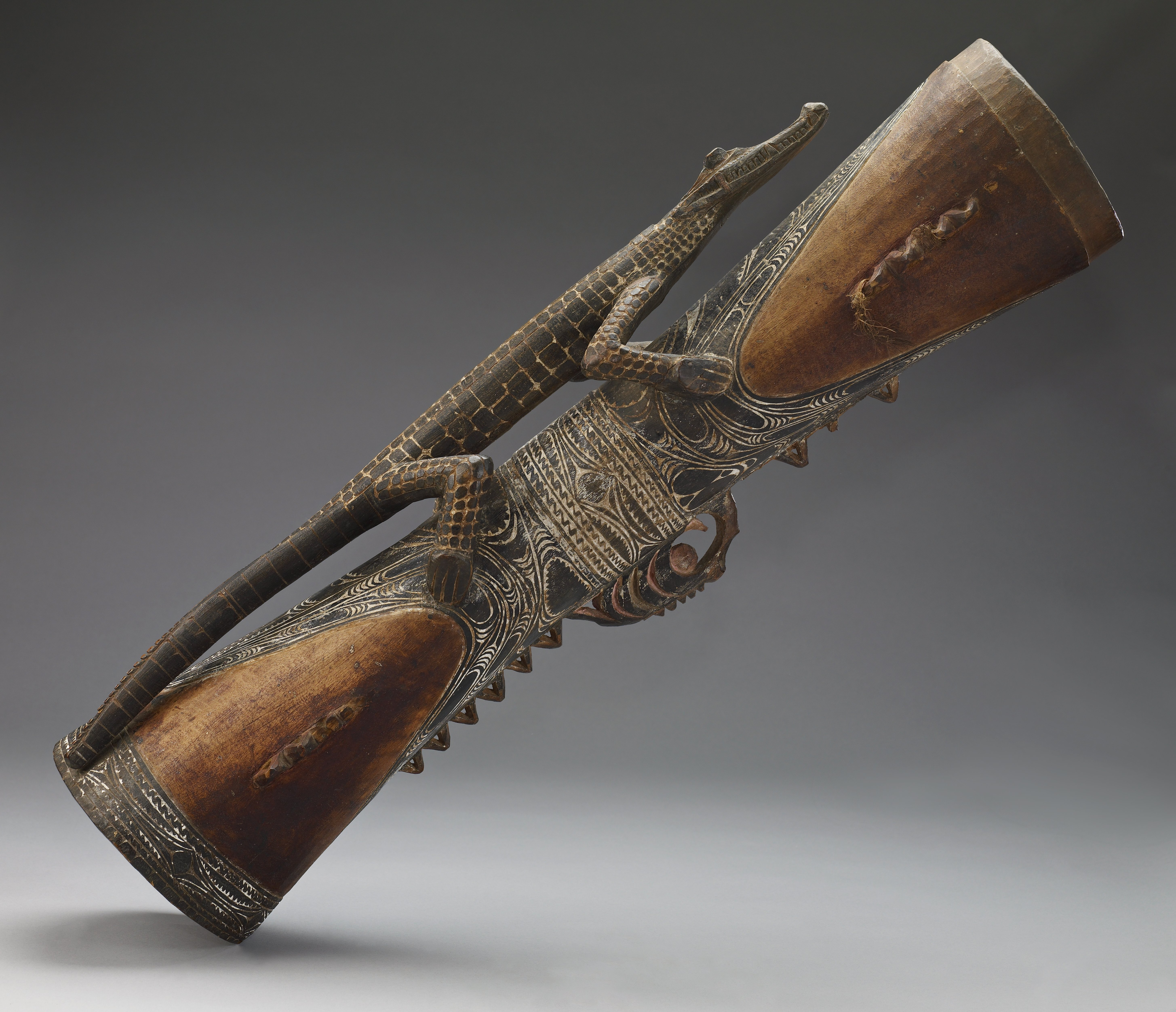
Kundu drum, from Papua-New Guinea, Iatmul people, 20th century. Kundu is Papuan general name used for drum. It is an hourglass shaped drum made of wood, and normally covered with a snake or lizard's skin as membrane. The crocodile is symbolic to the Iatmul, who believe they are descended from a giant crocodile, and that the world is the back of that first crocodile. There are three crocodiles on this instrument: the handle and each of the drum openings (seen in the engravings).

The Iatmul are a large ethnic group of about 10,000 people inhabiting some two-dozen politically autonomous villages along the middle Sepik River in Papua New Guinea. The communities are roughly grouped according to dialect of the Iatmul language as well as sociocultural affinities. The Iatmul are best known for their art, men's houses, male initiation, elaborate totemic systems, and a famous ritual called naven, first studied by Gregory Bateson in the 1930s. More recently, Iatmul are known as a location for tourists and adventure travellers, and a prominent role in the 1988 documentary film Cannibal Tours.

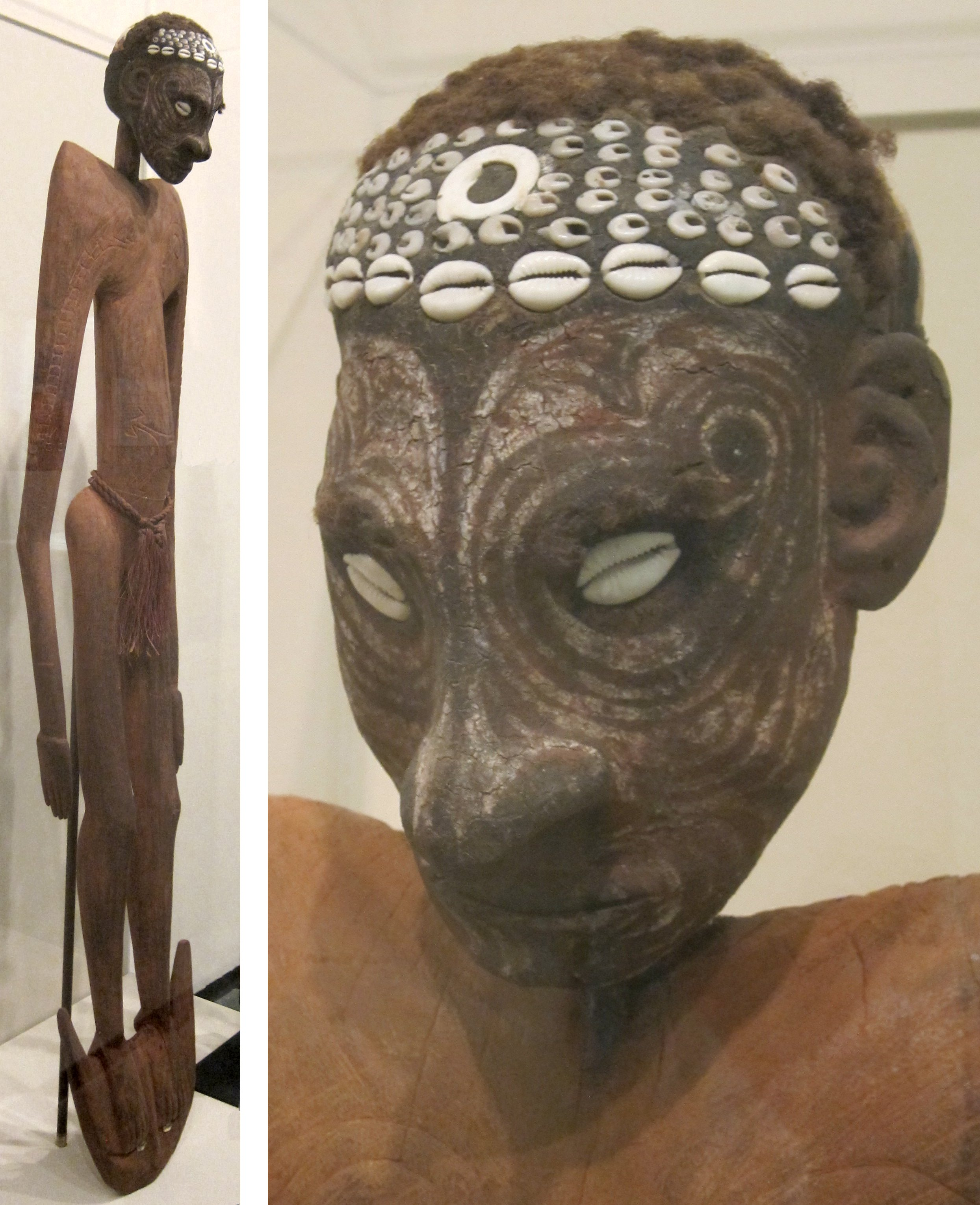
Ancestor Iatmul figure with skull

== History ==
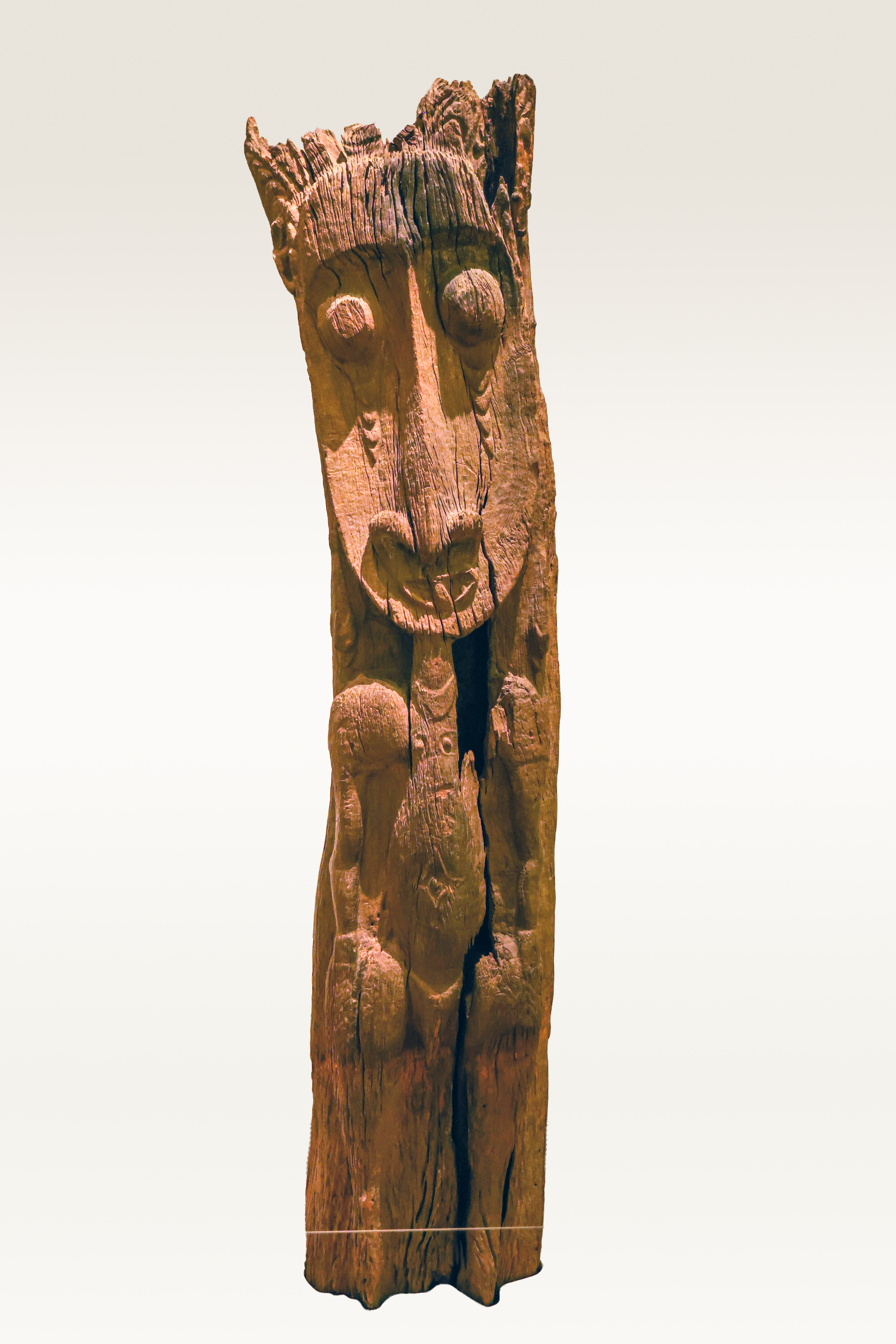
Carved posts of a latmul men's cult house.

In Iatmul legend, the original condition of the world was a primal sea. A wind stirred waves, and land surfaced. A large pit opened, and from it emerged the first generation of ancestral spirits and culture-heroes. The ancestors then embarked on a series of mythic-historic migrations. Where they trod, land appeared. Along these routes, the ancestors created the world through naming. Literally, they named all the features of the world into existence—trees, mountains, stars, winds, rains, tributaries, villages, actions, virtually everything in the world. These names are called totemic names. They are claimed by specific patrilineal groups (clans, lineages, and branches). Totemic names are magical, and form the basis for the religious system.

According to the Iatmul, the primal pit is located near the Sawos-speaking village of Gaikarobi. After emerging from the pit, most ancestors travelled to the village of Shotmeri. From there, they dispersed throughout the region, eventually arriving in each village inhabited today.

Each Iatmul community consists of clans, lineages, and "branches." Membership of a group is conferred at birth through the father, what anthropologists call patrilineal descent. Every village has its own cluster of groups; no two villages consist of exactly the same clans and lineages. Each group tells its own ancestral history of migrations through the region. These tales are encoded in long chains of complex polysyllabic names called tsagi that are known only to ritual specialists. When tsagi are chanted during rituals, the names evoke ancestral migrations and different places and features of the landscape created by the group's mythic ancestors during their long-ago travels.

== The name "Iatmul" ==
The word "Iatmul" was coined by Gregory Bateson during his initial period of anthropological research among the language group in the late 1920s. In his 1932 article in the journal Oceania, Bateson wrote that he "adopted the name Iatmul as a general term for the people. But I doubt whether I am right in so doing." In Mindimbit village, he reported, local people referred to the entire linguistic group with the compound phrase Iatmul-Iambonai. The word Iambon (pronounced Yambon) referred then, and still does, to the uppermost Iatmul-speaking village along the river. Iatmul referred only to a single, small clan. The use of the word Iatmul to signify the entire group was Bateson's convention, and it thereafter gained anthropological and wider currency. However, the term is rarely used by Iatmul speakers. In fact, Iatmul speakers rarely have reason to refer to the entire language group. The Iatmul are not a centralized tribe. They never act politically, socially, or economically as a single unit. Villages are autonomous. People tend to self-identify not as Iatmul or, as they sometimes say, Iatmoi, but in terms of their clan, lineage, village, or sometimes just the colonial-era regional term, Sepik.
