= Gerrie (given name) =

Gerrie is a Dutch and Afrikaans unisex given name. It is a diminutive of Ger, itself short for Gerard. As a birth name in the Netherlands, it is primarily feminine, peaking in popularities around 1950, but the name is more common as a nickname for men with the birth name Gerard(us) or Gerrit.

Men

- Gerrie Coetzee (1955–2023), South African boxer
- Gerrie Deijkers (1946–2003), Dutch footballer
- Gerrie Eijlers (born 1980), Dutch handball player
- Gerrie Germishuys (born 1949), South African rugby player
- Gerrie Kleton (1953-2006), Dutch footballer
- Gerrie Knetemann (1951-2004), Dutch cyclist
- Gerrie Labuschagné (born 1995), South African rugby player
- Gerrie Mühren (1946–2013), Dutch footballer
- Gerrie Nel (born 1961), South African lawyer and prosecutor
- Gerrie Pienaar (born 1959), South African cricket umpire
- Gerrie Slot (born 1954), Dutch track cyclist
- Gerrie Snyman (born 1981), Namibian cricketer

Women

- Gerrie Hammond (died 1992), Canadian politician (Geraldine)
- Gerrie Hondius (born 1970), Dutch comics artist and writer
- Gerrie Van Rompaey (born 1955), Belgian screenwriter
