= Giles Gering =

Giles Gering (fl. 16th century) was a notable artist at the court of Henry VIII of England.

Although not as sought after as Hans Holbein the Younger, he was considered to be in the same category as William Scrots, John Bettes and Levina Teerlinc.
