= Gerd Jendraschek =

German linguist

Jendraschek, Gerd is a German linguist specialized in Basque, Turkish, and Iatmul (a language from the East Sepik Province, Papua New Guinea). He was assistant professor of General and Comparative Linguistics at the University of Regensburg, Germany, until July 2012, and a Korea Foundation Fellow from September 2012 until August 2013. He is currently assistant professor at Sangmyung University in Cheonan, South Korea.
