= Gerd F. Glang =

United States military officer and hydrographer

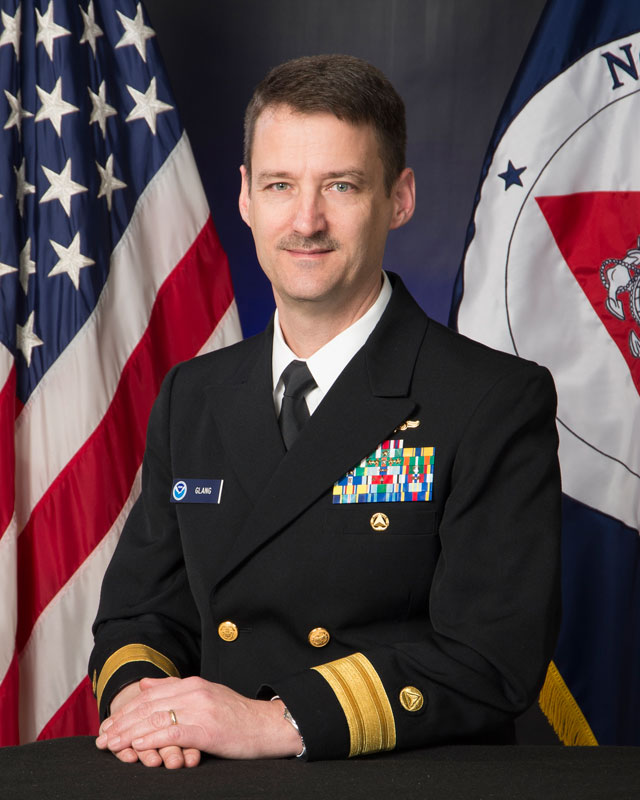
- Rear Admiral Gerd F. Glang, NOAA
- Allegiance: United States
- Branch: United States Air Force; NOAA Commissioned Officer Corps
- Service years: 1984–1989 (Air Force); 1989–2016 (NOAA Corps)
- Rank: Rear admiral (lower half)
- Commands: Director, Office of Coast Survey; NOAAS Ronald H. Brown; NOAAS Whiting
- Awards: Department of Commerce Silver Medal; Department of Commerce Bronze Medal (2); Air Force Commendation Medal; Coast Guard Commendation Medal; NOAA Corps Commendation Medal (2)

Gerd F. Glang is a former NOAA Corps rear admiral who last served as the director of the National Oceanic and Atmospheric Administration's Office of Coast Survey. In this position, he also concurrently served as the U.S. National Hydrographer and as one of the commissioners of the Mississippi River Commission. He was appointed by Acting Secretary of Commerce Rebecca Blank on August 13, 2012, after nomination by President Barack Obama, and confirmation by the U.S. Senate. He retired from the NOAA Corps on August 26, 2016 after over 32 years of combined uniformed service.

The Office of Coast Survey is the Nation's nautical chartmaker. With a history stretching back to 1807, when President Thomas Jefferson asked for a survey of the young Nation's coast, the office serves America's maritime trade, fishing fleets, and recreational sailors. Responsible for surveying and charting America's coastal and territorial waters as well as the Great Lakes, Coast Survey's hydrographic data, nautical products, research, and navigational services form an essential foundation for ocean transportation and the maritime economy.

== Career ==
A NOAA Corps officer since 1989, RDML Glang is a professional mariner, specializing in hydrographic surveying and seafloor mapping sciences. RDML Glang served aboard four NOAA ships. On the NOAAS Rainier, his first experiences in hydrography took him to the largely uncharted coastal waters of Alaska's southwest peninsula. He also served as the executive officer of NOAAS Heck. RDML Glang was commanding officer of NOAAS Whiting in 1999, when the ship responded to the seafloor search for John F. Kennedy Jr.'s, downed aircraft. Just three months later, he led the NOAAS Whiting to the first discovery of the seafloor debris fields from EgyptAir Flight 990. From 2008 to 2009, RDML Glang served as commanding officer of NOAA's largest ship, NOAAS Ronald H. Brown, with oceanographic and atmospheric research operations from the South Pacific to the Atlantic Coast. Projects included servicing oceanographic buoys in support of weather and atmospheric research, ocean mapping in support of tsunami modeling, and remotely operated vehicle exploration of deep-water corals.

Ashore, RDML Glang has served in various operational, technical, and leadership assignments. His prior assignments in the Office of Coast Survey include chief of the Hydrographic Surveys Division, chief of the Hydrographic Systems and Technology Programs; Northeast Regional Navigation Manager; chief of the Systems Support Branch; and chief of the Pacific Hydrographic Party. RDML Glang also served as the deputy lead of strategic planning for NOAA's National Ocean Service.

RDML Glang has been recognized on numerous occasions for outstanding service and leadership. His awards include the Department of Commerce Silver Medal, two Department of Commerce Bronze Medals, the Air Force Commendation Medal, the Coast Guard Commendation Medal, and two NOAA Corps Commendation Medals.

In 2019, RDML Glang took up the position of Director of Operations at HYPACK, a software company that is a division of Xylem Inc. He has oversight of all operations, which includes project management, sales, customer support, and software development.

== Education ==
RDML Glang graduated in 1984 from the State University of New York Maritime College with a bachelor's degree in electrical engineering, and a U.S. Coast Guard Deck Officer license. In 2004, he completed the University of New Hampshire graduate certificate program in advanced ocean mapping. RDML Glang is a 2012 graduate of the Federal Executive Institute’s Leadership for a Democratic Society program, and is a 2006 graduate of the Harvard Kennedy School Senior Executive Fellows program. Following graduation from New York Maritime College, RDML Glang completed Officer Training School and was commissioned in the U.S. Air Force before coming to NOAA in 1989.

RDML Glang lives in Maryland with his wife Cheryl and their two children.
