= Gerd Hahn =

Gerd Jürgen Hahn
- Born: 1981; Balingen, Germany
- Education: University of Antwerp (2001–2006); Catholic University of Eichstätt-Ingolstadt (Ph.D., 2011)
- Occupation(s): Economist and Professor for Business Economy

Gerd Jürgen Hahn (born 1981) is a German economist and professor for business economy. He holds an endowed professorship for Operations Management and Process Innovation at the German Graduate School of Management and Law (GGS) in Heilbronn.

== Life ==
After completing his Abitur at the commercial high school in Albstadt he, from 2001 onward, studied business economy at the Catholic University of Eichstätt-Ingolstadt and at the University of Antwerp. He completed his studies in 2006. From 2007 until 2012 he worked as business consultant for McKinsey & Company and in 2011 he earned his Ph.D. from the Catholic University of Eichstätt-Ingolstadt. In 2013 Hahn was offered an endowed junior professorship for Supply Chain Management at the University of Mannheim, which he accepted.

Since April 2015 Hahn is professor for Operations Management and Process Innovation at the German Graduate School of Management and Law (GGS) in Heilbronn. He is author of specialist articles, conference speeches and book contributions. He is also reviewer for a variety of specialist journals. His research focuses include value-centered Supply Chain Management, Robust Planning and Management of Production Systems, IT-Systems in Operations Management and Automotive Supply Chains.

Hahn is a former scholar of the German National Academic Foundation and winner of the knowledge competition "Logistik Masters 2006" of the specialist journal VerkehrsRundschau. In 2010 he was awarded with the "Horst-Wildemann-Price for Innovative Management Concepts" by the science commission for production economy of the Society of economy professors in the category Best-Paper-Award for junior scientists.

He is a member of various organizations, including the Decision Sciences Institute (DSI), the Working Group Supply Chain Management at the German Operations Research Society (GOR), the Institute for Operations Research and the Management Sciences (INFORMS) and the German Academic Association for Business Research (VHB).

== Publications (selection) ==
- A Perspective on Applications of In-memory Analytics in Supply Chain Management, Decision Support Systems, 76, 2015, S. 45–52, zus. mit J. Packowski.
- The Merit of Combining Stochastic and Deterministic Models For Planning Decision Support Systems, in: Tempelmeier H. and H. Kuhn (Hrsg.), Proceedings of the 9th Conference on Stochastic Models of Manufacturing and Service Operations, Ingolstadt, 2013, S. 239–246, together with N. Vandaele and C. Decouttere.
- Designing Decision Support Systems for Value-based Management: A Survey and an Architecture, Decision Support Systems, 53 (3), 2012, S. 591–598, together with H. Kuhn.
- Value-based Performance and Risk Management in Supply Chains: A Robust Optimization Approach, International Journal of Production Economics, 139 (1), 2012, S. 135–144, together with H. Kuhn.
- Enhancing Aggregate Production Planning with an Integrated Stochastic Queuing Model, in: Klatte, D., Lüthi, H.-J. and K. Schmedders (Hrsg.), Operations Research Proceedings 2011, Berlin (Springer), 2012, S. 451–456, together with C. Kaiser, H. Kuhn, L. Perdu and N.J. Vandaele.
- Optimising a Value-based Performance Indicator in Mid-term Sales and Operations Planning, Journal of the Operational Research Society, 62 (3), 2011, S. 515–525, together with H. Kuhn.
