= William Gehring =

William "Bill" Gehring (born December 20, 1962) is a psychologist, and in 2014 is the Arthur F. Thurnau Professor of Psychology at the University of Michigan in Ann Arbor, Michigan. He researches Event Related Potentials and is one of the discoverers of the Error Related Negativity. He has made contributions to the field of cognitive neuroscience through his studies on the electrophysiological markers of obsessive-compulsive disorder.

== Education ==
Bill graduated from the University of Illinois at Urbana–Champaign in 1992 with a Doctoral degree in cognitive/experimental psychology. He then completed a post-doctoral training at the University of California, Davis, before accepting a position at the University of Michigan - Ann Arbor.

== Career ==
On February 19, 2004, Bill was named an Arthur F. Thurnau Professor of Psychology at the University of Michigan.

Gehring has conducted studies and written a number of papers and articles about the brain and human motivation. He has been called upon by the press as a neuroscience expert to comment on controversial research in the field.

== Publications ==
- Hochman, E. Y., Orr, J. M., Gehring, W. J. (in press). Toward a more sophisticated response representation in theories of medial frontal performance monitoring: the effects of motor similarity and motor asymmetries. Cerebral Cortex.
- Ferdinand, N. K., Mecklinger, A., Kray, J., & Gehring, W. J. (2012). The processing of unexpected positive response outcomes in the mediofrontal cortex. Journal of Neuroscience, 32(35), 12087–12092. doi:10.1523/JNEUROSCI.1410-12.2012.
- Hanna, G. L., Carrasco, M., Harbin, S. M., Nienhuis, J. K., LaRosa, C. E., Chen, P., Fitzgerald, K. D., & Gehring, W. J. (2012). Error-related negativity and tic history in pediatric obsessive-compulsive disorder. Journal of the American Academy of Child and Adolescent Psychiatry, 51(9), 902–910.
- Liu, Y., Gehring, W. J., Weissman, D. H., Taylor, S. F., Fitzgerald, K. D. (2012). Trial-by-trial adjustments of cognitive control following errors and response conflict are altered in pediatric obsessive-compulsive disorder. Frontiers in Psychiatry, 3(41), 1–8. doi: 10.3389/fpsyt.2012.00041.
- Gehring, W. J., Liu, Y., Orr, J. M., & Carp, J. (2012). The error-related negativity (ERN/Ne). In S. J. Luck, & E. Kappenman (eds.), Oxford handbook of event-related potential components (pp. 231–291). New York: Oxford University Press.
- Bernat, E.M., Nelson, L.D., Steele, V.R., Gehring, W.J., & Patrick, C. J. (2011). Externalizing psychopathology and gain/loss feedback in a simulated gambling task: Dissociable components of brain response revealed by time-frequency analysis. Journal of Abnormal Psychology, 120(2), 352–364.
- Mai, X., Tardif, T., Doan, S. N., Liu, C., Gehring, W. J., & Luo, Y-J. (2011). Brain activity elicited by positive and negative feedback in preschool-aged children. PLoS One, 6(4), e18774.
- Stern, E. R., Welsh, R. C., Fitzgerald, K. D., Gehring, W. J., Lister, J. J., Himle, J. A., Abelson, J. L, & Taylor, S. F. (2011). Hyperactive error responses and altered connectivity in ventromedial and frontoinsular cortices in obsessive-compulsive disorder. Biological Psychiatry, 69, 583–591. PMID 21144497.
- Stern, E.R., Liu Y., Gehring, W.J;, Lister, J.J., Yin, G., Zhang, J, Fitzgerald, K.D., Himle, J.A,. Abelson, J.L., & Taylor, S.F. (2010). Chronic medication does not affect hyperactive error responses in obsessive-compulsive disorder. Psychophysiology, 47(5), 913–920.
- Anguera, J. A., Seidler, R. D., & Gehring, W. J. (2009). Changes in performance monitoring during sensorimotor adaptation. Journal of Neurophysiology, 102, 1868–1879.
- Liu, Y., & Gehring, W. J. (2009). Loss feedback negativity elicited by single- vs. conjoined-feature stimuli. NeuroReport, 20(6), 632–636.
- Liu, D., Sabbagh, M. A., Gehring, W. J., & Wellman, H. (2009). Neural correlates of children's theory of mind development. Child Development, 80(2), 318–326.
- Bernat, E. M., Nelson, L. D., Holroyd, C. B., Gehring, W. J., & Patrick, C. J. (2008). Separating cognitive processes with principal components analysis of EEG time-frequency distributions. Proceedings of SPIE, 7074, 7074S 1–10.
- Liu, D., Sabbagh, M. A., Gehring, W. J., & Wellman, H. (2009). Neural correlates of children's theory of mind development. Child Development.
- Taylor, S. F., Stern, E. R., & Gehring, W. J. (2007). Neural systems for error monitoring: Recent findings and theoretical perspectives. The Neuroscientist, 13, 162–172.
- Gehring, W. J. (2006). Ordinary minds, extraordinary violence. Science and Theology News, 6 (11/12), 36.
- Masaki, H., Takeuchi, S., Gehring, W. J., Takasawa, N., & Yamazaki, K. (2006). Affective-motivational influences on feedback-related ERPs in a gambling task. Brain Research, 1105, 110–121.
- Sarter, M., Gehring, W. J., & Kozak, R. (2006). More attention must be paid: The neurobiology of attentional effort. Brain Research Reviews, 51, 145–160.
- Taylor, S. F., Martis, B., Fitzgerald, K. D., Welsh, R. C., Abelson, J. L., Liberzon, I., Himle, J. A., & Gehring, W. J. (2006). Medial frontal cortex activity and loss-related responses to errors. The Journal of Neuroscience, 26(15), 4063–4070.
- Bernat, E., Williams, W. J., & Gehring, W. J. (2005). Decomposing ERP time-frequency energy using PCA. Clinical Neurophysiology, 116, 1314-1334 .
- Fitzgerald, K. D., Welsh, R. C., Gehring, W. J., Abelson, J.L, Himle, J.A., Liberzon, I., & Taylor, S. F. (2005). Error-related hyperactivity of the anterior cingulate cortex in obsessive compulsive disorder. Biological Psychiatry, 57, 287–294.
- Gehring, W. J., & Taylor, S. F. (2004). When the going gets tough, the cingulate gets going. Nature Neuroscience, 7, 1285 – 1287.
- Liu, D., Sabbagh, M. A., Gehring, W. J., Wellman, H. M. (2004). Decoupling beliefs from reality in the brain: An ERP study of theory of mind. NeuroReport, 29, 991–995.
- Masaki, H., Gehring, W. J., Takasawa, N., Yamazaki, K. (2004). The functional significance of the error-related negativity in action monitoring. Japanese Journal of Physiological Psychology and Psychophysiology, 22(1), 3–18.
- Gehring, W. J. & Willoughby, A. R. (2004). Are all medial frontal negativities created equal? Toward a richer empirical basis for theories of action monitoring.
- In M. Ullsperger & M. Falkenstein (eds.), Errors, Conflicts, and the Brain. Current Opinions on Performance Monitoring (pp. 14–20). Leipzig : Max Planck Institute of Cognitive Neuroscience. [Note that the arrows in Figure 3 are corrected in this file but were published erroneously in the full volume linked below.] (Full Ullsperger and Falkenstein volume available here: M. Ullsperger & M. Falkenstein (eds.), Errors, Conflicts, and the Brain. Current Opinions on Performance Monitoring. Leipzig : Max Planck Institute of Cognitive Neuroscience.)
- Taylor, S. F., Welsh, R. C., Wager, T.D., Luan Phan, K.L., Fitzgerald, K. D., & Gehring, W. J. (2004). A functional neuroimaging study of motivation and executive function. Neuroimage, 21, 1045–1054.
- Gehring, W. J., Karpinski, A., & Hilton, J. L. (2003). Thinking about interracial interactions. Nature Neuroscience, 6, 1241–1243.
- Gehring, W. J., Bryck, R., Jonides, J., Albin, R., Badre, D. (2003). The mind's eye, looking inward? In search of executive control in internal attention switching. Psychophysiology, 40, 572–585.
- Gehring, W. J., & Willoughby, A. R. (2002). The medial frontal cortex and the rapid processing of monetary gains and losses. Science, 295, 2279–2282.
- Gehring, W. J., & Knight, R. T. (2002). Lateral prefrontal damage affects processing selection but not attention switching. Cognitive Brain Research, 13, 262–279.
- Gehring, W. J., & Fencsik, D. E. (2001). Functions of the medial frontal cortex in the processing of conflict and errors. The Journal of Neuroscience, 21(23), 9430–9437.
- Gehring, W. J., & Knight, R. T. (2000). Prefrontal - cingulate interactions in action monitoring. Nature Neuroscience, 3, 516–520.
- Gehring, W. J., Himle, J., & Nisenson, L. G. (2000). Action monitoring dysfunction in obsessive-compulsive disorder. Psychological Science, 11, 1–6.
- Awh, E., & Gehring, W. J. (1999). The anterior cingulate cortex lends a hand in response selection. Nature Neuroscience, 2, 853–854.
- Gehring, W. J., & Fencsik, D. (1999). Slamming on the brakes: An electrophysiological study of error response inhibition. Poster presented at the Annual Meeting of the Cognitive Neuroscience Society, Washington, D. C., April 11–13, 1999.
- Scheffers, M. K., Coles, M. G. H., Bernstein, P., Gehring, W. J., & Donchin, E. (1996). Event-related brain potentials and error-related processing: An analysis of incorrect responses to go and no-go stimuli. Psychophysiology, 33, 42-53
- Gehring, W. J., Coles, M. G. H., Meyer, D. E., & Donchin, E. (1995). A brain potential manifestation of error-related processing. In G. Karmos, M. Molnar, V. Csepe, I. Czigler and J. E. Desmedt (Eds.) Perspectives of Event-Related Potentials Research, Journal of Electroencephalography and Clinical Neurophysiology, Supplement 44, (pp. 287–296).
- Gehring, W. J., & Coles, M. G. H. (1994). "Expectancy and response strategy to sensory stimuli": Comment. Neurology, 44, 2212–2213.
- Gehring, W. J., Goss, B., Coles, M. G. H., Meyer, D. E., & Donchin, E. (1993). A neural system for error detection and compensation. Psychological Science, 4, 385–390.
- Gehring, W. J., Gratton, G., Coles, M. G. H., & Donchin, E. (1992). Probability effects on stimulus evaluation and response processes. Journal of Experimental Psychology: Human Perception and Performance, 18, 198–216.
