= Gerd Kehrer =

German painter (born 1939)

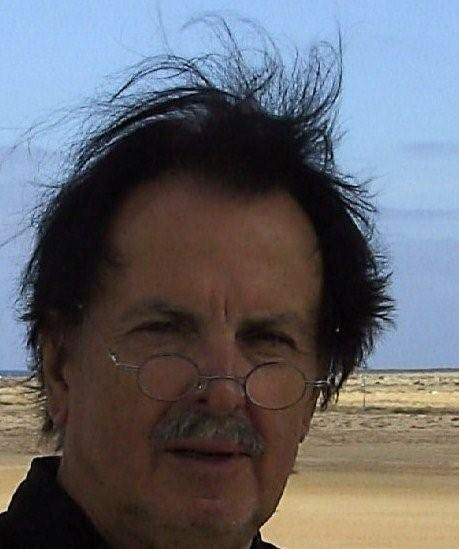
- Kehrer in 2013.
- Born: April 7, 1939 (age 87); Frankfurt
- Occupation: Painter

Gerd Kehrer (born 7 April 1939) is a German painter.

== Gallery ==
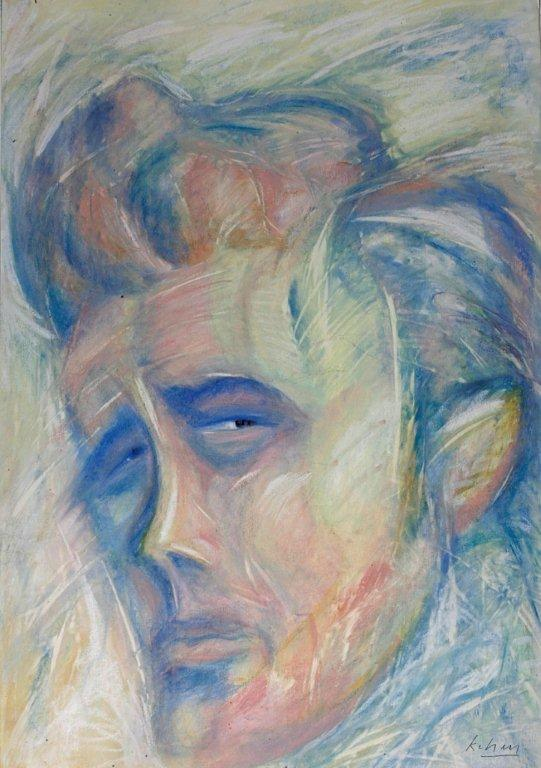

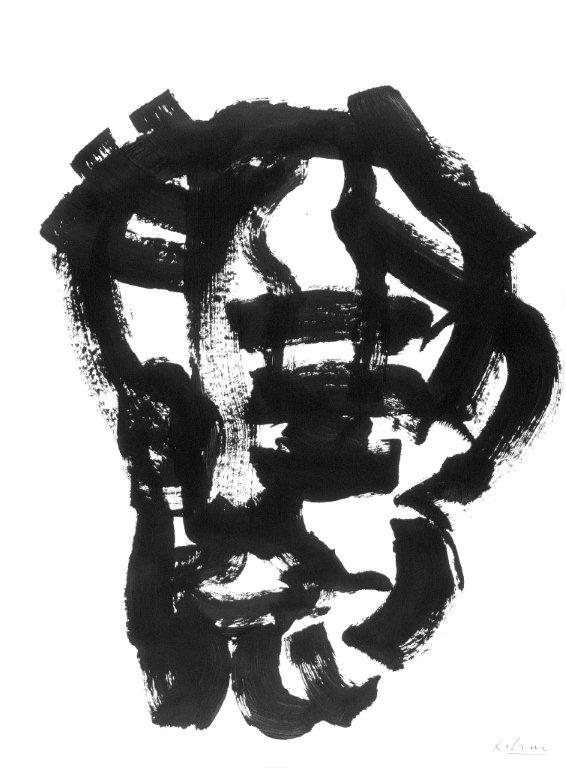

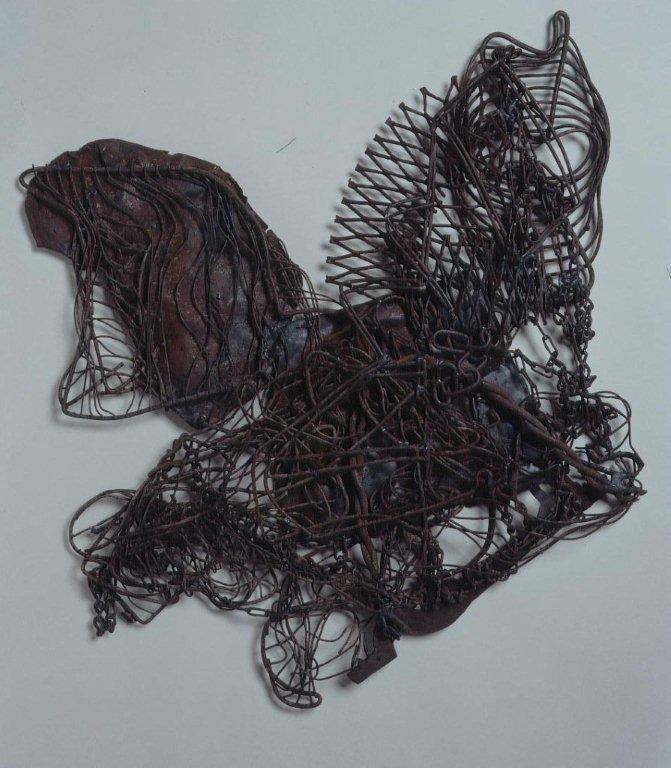

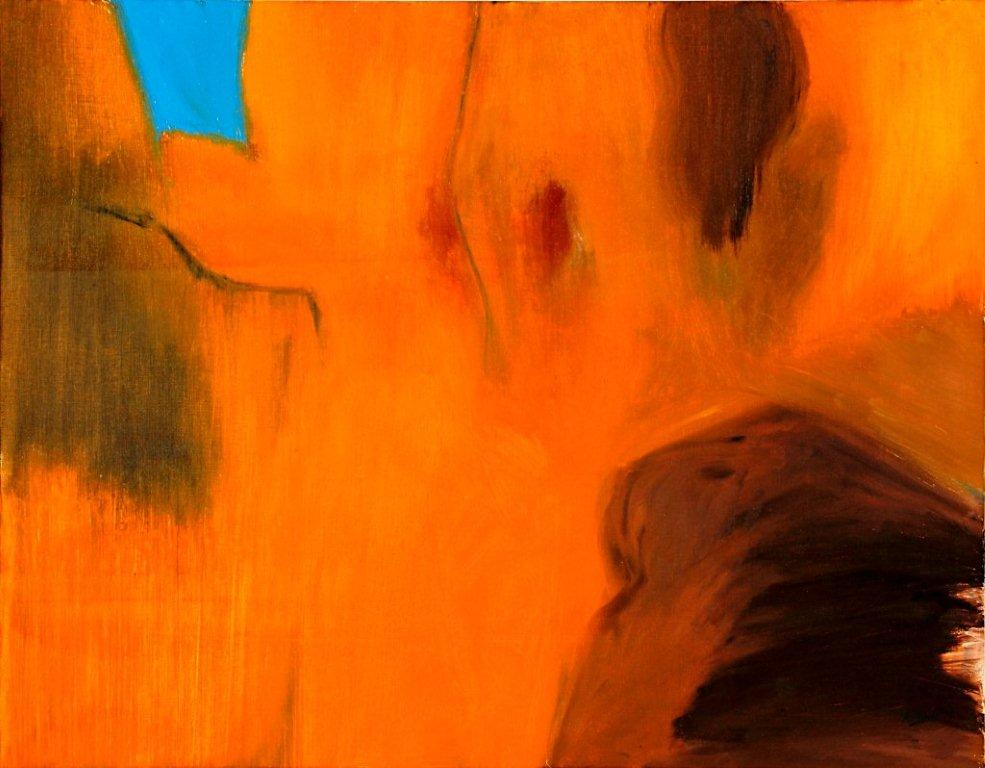

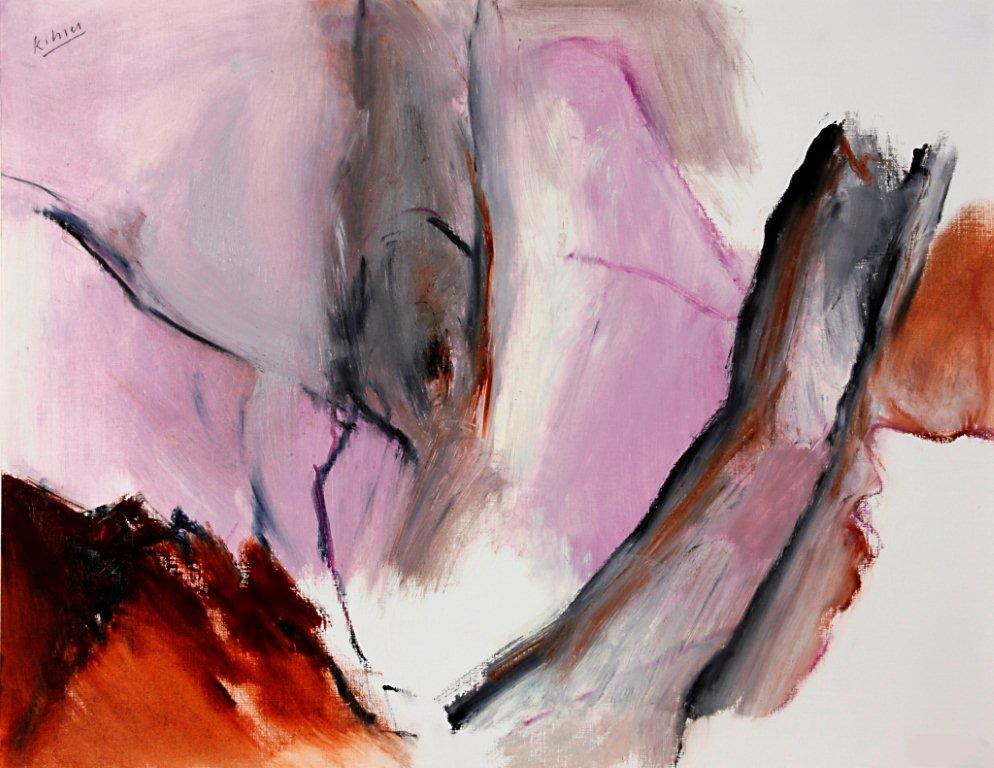
