= Iatmul language =

Ndu language spoken in Papua New Guinea

Iatmul
- gepmakudi
- Native to: Papua New Guinea
- Region: Sepik River basin
- Ethnicity: Iatmul people
- Native speakers: 8,400 (2003)
- Language family: Sepik: Middle Sepik; Ndu; Iatmul
- Dialects: Nyaula or Nyaura (Western); Pali'bei or Palimbei (Central); Waliakwi (Eastern); Maligwat (Northern)

Language codes
- ISO 639-3: ian
- Glottolog: iatm1242
- ELP: Iatmul

East Sepik Province in Papua New Guinea

Iatmul is the language of the Iatmul people, spoken around the Sepik River in the East Sepik Province, northern Papua New Guinea. The Iatmul, however, do not refer to their language by the term Iatmul, but call it gepmakudi ("village language", from gepma = "village" and kudi "speech"; pronounced as [ŋɡɛpmaɡundi]).

There are about 8,400 Iatmul traditionally organized in villages, whereas a total amount of 46,000 speakers is estimated. The inhabitants of the villages are trilingual, being fluent with Tok Pisin, good with Iatmul and having some knowledge of English. Tok Pisin is also the first language of the youngest children, despite efforts to reverse this trend.

An extensive grammar of Iatmul has been recently written by Gerd Jendraschek as a postdoctoral thesis.

== Typological profile ==
Iatmul is part of the Ndu language family, which consists of at least six languages in which ndu is the word for 'man'. Together with Manambu it is the southernmost language of the Ndu family, spoken along the Sepik River. Iatmul is perhaps the best known Ndu language of them all.

Iatmul is a moderately agglutinative and nearly isolating language. Flexion is predominantly suffixed and very regular, whereas the phonological processes are the most complex ones within the language. Stems often change their form while multiple-morpheme structures can become so coalescent that they are difficult to segment.

Iatmul has masculine and feminine gender marking as well as singular, dual and plural numbers. Nouns and verbs are the only two major classes in Iatmul with only little derivation across them. Also, there is not a strong distinction between modifiers and nouns as many roots can be used as nouns, adjectives or adverbs. Smaller word classes include personal pronouns, demonstratives, postpositions, quantifiers, interrogatives as well as proclauses (yes, no), while there are no clause-linking conjunctions.

== Phonology ==
=== Vowel and consonant phonemes ===
The phonological system of Iatmul is a matter of controversy among scholars. There is no consensus about how many vowels Iatmul has and about which realisations are to be considered as phonemes or allophones. There were attempts of analysing the language as consisting of only 1-3 vowels by Staalsen (1966) and Laycock (1991). Jendraschek (2012) in contrast describes 12 phonemic monophthongs and 7 phonemic diphthongs.

Monophthongs
		Front	Central	Back
High		i ⟨i⟩	ɨ ⟨i'⟩	u ⟨u⟩, uː ⟨uu⟩
Mid		e ⟨e⟩, (eː) ⟨ee⟩		o ⟨o⟩
Low	plain	a ⟨a⟩, aː ⟨aa⟩		ɑ ⟨â⟩ (Note: Â is only written with the circumflex if a contrasting word with /a/ exists.)
Low	glottalised	aˀ ⟨a'⟩		ɑˀ ⟨â'⟩

Diphthongs
		Front		Back	
High		[ɨi̯] ⟨wi⟩ (Note: [ɨi̯] is underlying /wi/, and occurs after /m/. It can also tend towards [ʉi̯].)			
Mid		ɛɪ̯ ⟨ei⟩		ou̯ ⟨ou⟩	
Low	plain	ai̯~ɒi̯ ⟨ai⟩	aːi̯ ⟨aai⟩	aʊ̯ ⟨au⟩	aːʊ̯ ⟨aau⟩
Low	glottalised	aˀi̯ ⟨a'i⟩			

Consonant phonemes
		Labial	Alveolar	Palatal	Velar
Stop	fortis	pː ⟨pp⟩	tː ⟨tt⟩		kː ⟨kk⟩
Stop	nasal	(pᵐ) ⟨p'⟩ (Note: /pᵐ/ only occurs as an allophone of /p/ before vowel-initial suffixes. It is indicated orthographically.)			kᵑ ⟨k'⟩ (Note: /kᵑ/ mainly occurs as an allophone of /k/ before vowel-initial suffixes, according to Jendraschek there are only three words where it is phonemic.)
Stop	oral lenis	p ⟨p⟩	t ⟨t⟩		k ⟨k⟩
Stop	prenasalized lenis	ᵐb ⟨b⟩	ⁿd ⟨d⟩		ᵑɡ ⟨g⟩
Affricate			t͡ʃ ⟨ch⟩ ⁿd͡ʒ ⟨j⟩		
Fricative		β ⟨v⟩	s ⟨s⟩		
Nasal		m ⟨m⟩	n ⟨n⟩	ɲ ⟨ny⟩	(ŋ) ⟨n'⟩ (Note: /g/ and /k/+/n/ are identical phonetically, both producing [ŋɡ], and the only way to distinguish them is morphology. [n] and [ŋ] are also in free variation word-finally, which is maintained when suffixes are added. Thus, [ŋ] is written as n'.)
Approximant		w ⟨w⟩	ɾ~l ⟨l⟩ (Note: /l/ and /ɾ/ are in free variation, they are both written as l. The lateral is usually the predominant realisation, other than in western Iatmul, where the tap is dominant.)	j ⟨j⟩	

In Iatmul, the contrast between the fortis, lenis, and prenasalized stops exists only intervocalically. The fully oral stops can be voiced (to /b/, /d/, /g/), and as such they have voiced allophones in certain contexts. The latter also tend to be more open than the fortis stops, which means that they can become taps, fricatives, or approximants in post-sonorant position. Prenasalized stops are inherently voiced. As such, the distinctive feature between the fortis and oral series is not voicing, but rather voiceability.

==== Variation of oral stops ====
Source: Jendraschek
		Phoneme	Initial	Post-Sonorant/ Intervocalic	Post-nasal
fortis	Labial	/pː/	n/a	[p]	n/a
fortis	Alveolar	/tː/	n/a	[t]	n/a
fortis	Alveolar	/kː/	n/a	[k]	n/a
oral	Labial	/p/	[p]	[p~β] (Note: Unlike /t/ and /k/, /p/ is sometimes "resistant" to lenition. Lenited /p/ is also always written as v.)	[p]
oral	Alveolar	/t/	[t~ɾ] (Note: /t/'s alternation to /ɾ/ is always indicated in the orthography.)	[ɾ~d]	[d]]
oral	Alveolar	/k/	[k]	[g~ɣ~ɰ]	[g]
nasal	Labial	/ᵐb/	[ᵐb]		[b]
nasal	Alveolar	/ⁿd/	[ⁿd]		[d]
nasal	Alveolar	/ᵑɡ/	[ᵑɡ]		[g]

=== Segmental phonology ===
==== Syllable structure ====
The canonical syllable structure of Iatmul is C(A)V(C), where the first consonant can be any consonant other than the "geminates". Only approximants/liquids can be in the second onset position. Possible codas are only [p], [t], [k], [m], [n], and [ɲ] (the lenis plosives and nasals). Most words begin with the nasal consonants [m], [n] or the plosive consonants [p], [k]. Excluded from this rule are about 5% of the words in Iatmul, which begin with the vowels [a] or [a:].

==== Assimilation ====
A very common phenomenon in Iatmul is regressive assimilation.

kuvin -bi'k → [ˈkuβimbɨk]
straighten {dual suffix} {} {'you/they both straightened'}

Assimilation can be blocked to avoid ambiguity. Whereas (2a) is ambiguous due to assimilation of bâk to bap, example (2b) is not ambiguous as assimilation was blocked in favour of a clear meaning.

wugi bap-ba ki’-di
D3.SG.M moon-LOC eat-3PL
'they were eating (during) that month' or
'they were eating (from) that pig’

wugi bâk-ba ki’-di
D3.SG.M pig-LOC eat-3PL
'they were eating (from) that pig'

==== Elision and fusion ====
Elision can also be encountered very frequently. In the following example, both vowel fusion and onset elision are operating at the same time, making the meaning of the final form hard to recognize.

wa-ka-a → wa-a → wa:
say-PRS-SR {} say-PRS.SR {} {}

==== Epenthesis ====
Epenthesis can be observed when for example focus is marked with the suffix -a:

kada -a → kada-n-a
who FOC(3.SG.M) {} {}

==== Reduction ====
Reduction mostly happens quantitatively, so that the vowels are shorted in their length. Qualitative reduction happens on a rare occasion and mainly occurs during monophthongization.

=== Lexical stress ===
In Iatmul, words are not differentiated via pitch or accentuation. The meanings of words are not autonomous, but influenced by factors like vocal length, syllable structure and speed of enunciation. The following rules are the most important ones in descending order:

- Long vowels are stressed (ti’baadi’ [tɨˈmbaːndɨ], 'he can stay')
- CVC syllables are stressed (ti’kali’ka [tɨˈɡaɾɡa], 'meanwhile')
- Word-initial syllables are stressed.

In compounds, these rules can be randomly applied to the first or to the second word. As diphthongs are not stressed, there are no long monophthongized diphthongs.

=== Sentence intonation ===
A phonological utterance ends with falling intonation. Simple sentences are marked via pauses. Complex sentences end with falling intonation. Questions are marked via variations in pitch. Focus is marked by initial high intonation and a subsequent fall of the pitch.

== Morphology ==
=== Verbal structure ===
Iatmul is a moderately agglutinative language in which suffixes are dominating. Therefore, much information is being expressed morphologically instead of syntactically, which is true especially for the category of the verb. Information regarding actions like the direction, the manner or temporal relations are expressed via derivation of the verbs. There are many affixes specifying the manner in which an action is performed, like the means or the amount of control over the action.

Structure of a fully inflected verb
-2	-1	1	2	3	4	5	6
Neg	Manner	Root(s)	Directional	Event-specifier	Aspect	Tense/Mood	Subject-agreement
Derivation -------------------------------------------------------→						←------------------------ Inflection

==== Person ====
Iatmul pronouns and cross-ref suffixes
Number	Pronouns		Cross-reference (to the subject) markers		
Number	Free	Right-bound	Left-bound on verbs	Left-bound on non-verb predicates	Left and right-bound
1sg	wun	wun-	-wun	-wun	-w-
2sg masc	mi'n	mi'n-	-mi'n	-mi'n	-m-
2sg fem	nyi'n	nyi'n-	-nyi'n	-nyi'n	-ny-
3sg masc	di'	di'n-	-di'	-a	-d-
3sg fem	li'	li'l-	-li'	-ak	-l-
1dl (dual)	an	an-	-li	-li	-li-
2/3dl	bi'k	bi'l-	-bi'k	-bi'k	-b-
1pl	ni'n	ni'n-	-ni'n	-ni'n	-n-
2pl	guk	gul-	-guk	-guk	-gw-
3pl	di	din-	-di	-di	-j-

==== Tense, mood and aspect ====
Temporal marking exists in present tense and past tense, but not in the future tense. The marker for the present tense is -ka and in some cases the allomorph -a. The past tense is unmarked. Thus, some tenses can be distinguished only by the length of a single vowel.

kiya-a-di'
bring-PRS-3SG.M
'he brings'

kiya-Ø-di'
bring-PST-3SG.M
'he brought'

The expression of future is covered by the irrealis mood with the allomorphs -kiya,-ikiya (after roots ending with -a) and it' short form -ika occurring in fast speech. Besides future reference, the irrealis expresses possibility and permission and can be used in conditional constructions.

ya-ikiya-wun
come-IRR-1SG
'I will come'

The imperfective aspect marker -ti'~li' occurs most often with the present tense. Therefore, in some constructions in which present cannot be marked (e.g. nominalized clauses), the imperfective expresses present time reference. Thus, it' semantics is about to shift from aspect to tense.

Other aspects in Iatmul are

- Hortative marked with -kak, -li, -lu
- Optative marked with -ba and -ka
- Apprehensive marked with -ka
- Imperative, which is built using the bare stem or additionally by the suffix -li'.

==== Event specifiers ====
A special category in Iatmul are event-specifier-suffixes. Temporal relations are expressed with

- -jibu: event takes place during the whole night until sunrise
- -pwali: expresses that the event is done continuously
- -ki’va: expresses that something else is done in the middle of one action (interruption)
- -si’bla: expresses that an event occurs as the first one before any other events (anteriority)

nyiga kasa-jibu-di
leaf play-DAY.BREAK-3PL
'they played cards until daybreak'

Other event-specifiers express the extent of the action (complete, incomplete, all of its parts) or the frustrative (attempt, failure).

=== Case marking ===
In Iatmul, at least three cases with overlapping functions are assumed. Jendraschek argues, that it is not possible to define basic meanings for the cases, as the case markers often are polysemous. In general, case marking does not depend on the head but also on pragmatic circumstances and especially semantic properties of the controlling verb and its dependent noun. Thus, there is no strict division into structural and semantic cases in Iatmul.

Case marking has the whole noun phrase in its scope so that they are placed at the end of the phrase. This is also the case when the end of the word is not the head noun.

waani ki'ta gepma ki'ta-ba wakkai-laa li'di'
erima tree one {[village one]_{NP}-LOC} ascend:go-CONSEC stay-3SG.M
'There was an erima tree growing in one village'

==== Nominative case (zero marking) ====
Subjects as well as copula subjects and copula complements are always zero-marked with respect to their case. The direct object remains unmarked if it is low in animacy or definiteness. Goals are not always marked with an overt case-marker, especially when they are inanimate.

==== Dative case ====
The marker for the so-called dative is -kak with the allomorph -kat. As pronouns and proper nouns are always definite, they are marked with dativ case when they are used as transitive objects. When definite nouns referring to humans are transitive objects, the marker is preferred but not obligatory. The same is the case with non-human animates (like animals), whereas here the marking more likely indicates specificity of the object ('the dog' or 'one dog'):

wa'la-kak vi'-mi'n?
dog-DAT see-2SG.M
'Have you seen the dog?'

wa'la vi'-min?
dog see-2SG.M
'Have you seen a/the dog?'

Whether a transitive objects has to be marked with -kak is also depending on the meaning of the predicate. Dead animals are not perceived the same way as animate, specific animals, so that marking is not employed in sentences where someone eats an animal. On the other hand, when an animal eats a human, marking is employed.

Beside transitive objects, other semantic roles like recipient, addressee, theme and reason can be marked with the dative marker. Animate goals are also marked with the dative case.

==== Locative case ====
The so-called locative is marked with -(na)ba. Its main function is to mark locations, in some contexts including time expressions. Regarding transitive objects, its functions overlap with those of the dative marker -kak, so that in some context it is assumed that there is no difference in meaning between both markers. Still, usually it marks transitive objects with non-human referents including those who do not accept -kak.

wan gusi'ga-ba ta da-ba ki'-ka li'-di'
D3.SG.M box-LOC stay:SR thing-LOC eat-DEP stay-3SG.M
'He was already eating the things that were in that box.'

Besides marking of location and transitive objects, the locative case can also mark themes, manner, material, instruments, goals, sources and animate recipients. In case of the animate recipients, -ba can only be used if the recipient is perceived more as a location where something is left instead of the finial recipient.

==== Other cases ====
- Allative marker -ak and allomorph -alak: marks goal in the sense of purposes of activities instead of locations as well as recipients.
- Comitative marker -(a)na(la) and -akwi or (-)okwi: It is unclear according to which rules these allomorphs are distributed.
- Vocative marker -o: The only function of the vocative is to signal that a noun phrase refers to the addressee. It is not used obligatorily but rather when the name has to be repeated in case the addressee did not hear the first call.

=== Gender ===
In Iatmul, gender is not marked on the noun but on its modifiers (demonstratives) instead as well as via subject-verb-agreement. Often this is also true for number-marking, where only some nouns can be marked with a plural suffix.

{kan /} kat nyaan wega {yi-di' /} yi-li'
{D1.SG.M /} D1.SG.F. child market {go-3SG.M /} go-3SG.F
'This (male/female) child went to the market.'

{ankwi /} akkwi ji'vwa
{D2.SG.M.NR:REM /} D2.SG.F.NR:REM work
'that (hard/simple) work'

Referents without natural gender like inanimate entities are marked with respect to gender depending on their size. Thus, bigger referents are marked as masculine whereas smaller referents are marked as feminine. From both gender markers, masculine is perceived as the unmarked one and thus chosen if no characterisation is intended.

ki'viya vaali'-ka-di'
mosquito bite-PRS-3SG.M
'A large mosquito is stinging [me].'

However, there are some referents in Iatmul without natural gender but still with fixed grammatical gender. Among them are nya 'sun', which is masculine, whereas bap 'moon' is feminine. Also, some animal species have specific gender regardless of their biological gender, like kaami 'fish' (masculine). Some nouns can have both genders interchangeably without a difference in meaning as di'mai 'season'.

=== Number ===
==== Plural marking on nouns ====
Iatmul has singular, dual and plural number. As it is with gender, number usually is not marked on the noun. Instead, number can be marked on the determiners or modifiers of the noun as well as via subject-verb-agreement. Plurality can also be marked twice.

wun-a wudi da
1SG-GEN D3:PL thing
'those things of mine'

wun-a-di wudi da
1SG-GEN-PL D3:PL thing
'those things of mine'

Dual or plural marking on the verb indicates the number of the subject referent. However, this is only true for human referents. Non-human referents are always marked singular on the verb as they are not perceived as individuals.

wa'k du ki'-li'-ka-di
crocodile man eat-IPFV-PRS-3PL
'the men eat the crocodile' (cannot mean: 'the crocodiles eat the men')

There are some exceptional cases in which nouns can employ plural marking. Kinship terms like walaga ‘ancestor’, nyagei 'sister' or ta’kwa 'wife' can be plural marked. But if ta’kwa is used in the meaning of 'woman', it cannot be suffixed with a plural marker as it does not employ a relational meaning.

di'n-a ta'kwa-du sak yi-di
3SG.M-GEN woman/wife-PL lake go-3PL
'his wives went to the lake'

gepma-na ta'kwa sak yi-di
village-GEN woman/wife lake go-3PL
'the women from the village went to the lake'

The modifiers of a kinship term can be plural-marked also when the kinship term is already plural-marked.

taba wun-a-di na-du ki’nki-sakkwat-di
already 1SG-GEN-PL grandchild-PL D1.SG.M.NR-many-PL
'I have already this many grand-children.'

==== Reduplication ====
It is also possible to reduplicate nouns. In this case, they do not convey the usual plural meaning, but rather a distributive one referring to the group as a whole, meaning ‘every’ instead of 'more than one'. Some reduplicated nouns additionally employ adverbial meaning, like kava ‘place’ as kava kava 'everywhere' and jibula 'day' as jibula jibula 'all the time'. When adjectives are reduplicated, they may be understood as plural-marked or as employing an elative meaning (good -> very good) depending on the context. When the genitive suffix -na is reduplicated, it can express the plurality of the possessee.

gepma gepma kalibi'k mi'na kan missionary-na~na sule ki'nki-a-n wa-a wa-di
village village carry-2/3DU only D1.SG.M missionary-GEN~PL school D1.M.SG.NR-3SG-M say-DEP say-3PL
'after the two had brought it to every village, they said "these are the missionaries' schools" '

==== Associative plural ====
The plural suffix -du which is used on kinship terms can be used on proper names to express ‘person together with people related to this person’ (associative plural). Those related people can be his kin, people living in the same house or friends of the referent.

Magina-du ya-a-di
Magina-PL come-PRS-3PL
'Magina and her mother/family are coming'

==== Numerals ====
Counting in Iatmul is accomplished in mixture of a quinary, decimal and vigesimal system. Cardinal numerals generally follow the noun. In this case, adjectives are placed before the noun. If numerals close the noun phrase, they carry the case-markers.

- The number 1 is ki'ta
- The number 5 is 'one hand', taba-nak (from ta'ba 'hand' and nak '(an)other (one)').
- The numbers 6 to 9 are counted elliptically as 'plus one', si'la-ki'ta (from si'la 'plus')
- The number 10 is 'two hands', taba-vli (vli being the short form of vi'li'li'k 'two').
- The number 15 is not three hands 'but two hands plus one hand', taba-vli kyeli taba-nak
- The number 20 is 'one whole man', dumi-ki'ta (from du 'man' and mi 'tree', referring to the number of all fingers and toes of a human)
- The number 30 is 'one whole man plus two hands', dumi-ki’ta kyeli taba-vli
- The number 100 is 'five whole men', dumi taba-nak.

Ordinal numbers are built by adding wan (probably from wa 'say') to cardinal numerals.

Most Papuan languages incorporated the counting system of Tok Pisin or adopted the English counting system, which are perceived as shorter and more transparent. Due to the more and more frequent use of other counting systems, many speakers of Iatmul cannot count correctly beyond 'twenty' in their own language.

== Syntax ==
=== General syntactic structure ===
There is no passive voice in Iatmul. The canonical sentence structure is SOV: Adverb - Subject - Adjunct - Object - Verb

Babla Ruth aguvali gaai-ba wun-kak ni’ma ki’ki’da kuk-kiya-li’.
today Ruth_{A} opposite house-LOC 1SG-DAT [big food]_{O} do-IRR-3SG.F
'Ruth will prepare a big meal for me in the house on the other side.'

Yes–no questions are not expressed syntactically but via intonation.

Ana {kla-mi'n ?/.}
NEG get-2SG.M
'Didn’t you understand?' or 'You didn’t understand.'

=== Negation ===
The expression of negation is accomplished by different morphological structures which often are etymologically unrelated.

Verbs are negated by placing the particle ana before the inflected verb. In case of non-verbal predicates or predicatively used adjectives, ana is placed in front of the pronominal subject marker.

Du-mi'n
man-2SG.M
'You're a man.'

Du ana-mi'n
man NEG-2SG.M
'You're not a man.'

Gepma-ba ki'-w-a ki'ki'da apma ana-di'
village-LOC eat-1SG-SR food good NEG-3SG.M
'the food I ate in the village was not good'

In dependent clauses, negation on the predicate is not possible. Therefore, negation is expressed by a periphrastic construction in which the suffix -lapman 'without' is attached to the predicate and combined with the auxiliary yi 'go'.

*Ana vi'-w-a ka'ik babla vi'si'makwi-kiya-di
NEG see-1SG-SR picture today show-IRR-3PL

Vi'-lapman yi'-w-a ka'ik babla vi'si'makwi-kiya-di
see-without go-1SG-SR picture today show-IRR-3PL
'Today they will show the film I haven't seen yet.'

To deny existence, the proclause ka'i is used.

Wun saanya ka'i
1SG money no
'I don't have any money'

Ke, the reduced form of ka'i, is used together with a non-finite or a subordinate form of the verb to form the prohibitive.

Ke yi-m-∅-a!
PROH go-2SG.M-REAL-SR
'Don't go (now)!'

For the irrealis, the negator wana is used which cannot be combined with realis forms.

Wana yi-m-ay-a!
NEG.OPT go-2SG.M-IRR-SR
'Don't go (later)!'

The optative on the other hand is negated by the verbal suffix -la.

Yiki'nba va'i, da-la-mi'n
gently step fall-APPR-2SG.M
'Walk slowly, otherwise you might fall.'

=== Nominalized subordinate clauses ===
One of the two types of subordinate clauses in Iatmul are nominalised clauses, which are used like attributive, adverbial or complement clauses. There are rare cases of headless relative clauses, where the predicate of the relative clause becomes the head. Usually this is avoided by preferring a general noun like du 'man' as a head.

{kaami k-a} du kiya-di'
{[fish eat-SR} man] die-3SG.M
{embedded clause} {head nominal} predicate
'The man who ate fish died.'

When the relative clause has a subject which is not co-referential with the head noun of the matrix clause, then the verb of the relative clause expresses this with a pronominal subject marker on the subordinate verb.

buk’-w-a vaak gawi-na wapuchapuk
[‍[tell-1SG-SR] topic] eagle-GEN story
'The topic I was talking about is the story about the eagle'

Some relative clauses do not have a common argument in the matrix clause so that the relation between the head noun and the relative clause becomes a matter of semantics or pragmatics rather than syntax.

To express conditional or temporal relations between clauses, the suffix sequence -a-n 'SN-NR' is used. In conditional clauses, there is a distinction only between irrealis (-ay-a-n) and realis (-a-n). Thus, the tense reference of the realis can be clarified only via the following clause. The verb within the relative clause can further be marked with the locative to emphasise the localisation in time.

gu ki’-j-ay-a-n-ba si’laam si’-kiya-di
water eat-3PL-IRR-SR-NR-LOC noise shoot-IRR-3PL
'If they drink, they will make a lot of noise'

=== Switch-reference ===
The second type of subordinate clauses in Iatmul are realised by switch-reference and allow for clause chains. With switch-reference markers on a verb it is possible to express whether the subject of one verb is also the subject of another verb. Thus, it is possible to keep track of the subjects within clause chains consisting of several subordinate clauses. Switch-reference is a special feature of the syntax of Iatmul.

If the subject of both clauses is the same, person is marked once and a non-finite verb form is mandatory in the subordinate clause. If the subjects are different, it is indicated by person-marking in both clauses and by the absence of tense-marking and non-final intonation. In tenseless clauses, semantic relations are expressed in same-subject and different-subject clauses by marking the dependent verb in the following way:

Semantic relation	same subject	different subject
contextual	-ka 'DEP'	subject marking only
consecutive	-taa 'CONSEC'	subject marking + particle mi'na
simultaneous	-kakwi 'SIM'	imperfective aspect -ti' + subject marking

-ka 'DEP' is unmarked and thus can also cover the other two relations.

ki’ki’da kuk-ka yaki ki’-li’-li’
[food do-DEP] [tobacco eat-IPFV-3.SG.F]
'She was smoking (while) preparing food'

ki’ki’da kut-ti’-li’ yaki ki’-li’-li’
[food do-IPFV-3.SG.F] [tobacco eat-IPFV-3.SG.F]
'(While) she_{i} was preparing food, she_{*i/j} was smoking'

Switch-reference clauses can be used to chronologically order the narrated event or to express temporal overlap, manner of the action or causality.

=== Tail-head linkage ===
A phenomenon typical for Papuan languages is tail-head linkage. It is the repetition of the last part of the sentence in the beginning of a new sentence. It frequently occurs together with switch-reference and is used to structure communicated information.

Di’-kat yi-ka ta’bak yi-ka di’n-a gusa-maan-ba kut-di’.
3SG.M-DAT go-DEP hand go-DEP 3SG.M-GEN paddle-leg-LOC touch-3SG.M
(The dog) going to him touching (him) he touched the back of his leg.

Kut-di’ di’-kak vi’-di’ avayabi’ pi’li’-ka wakwai-ka-di’
touch-3SG.M 3SG.M-DAT see-3SG.M path run-DEP advance-PRS-3SG.M
He (=the dog) touched he (=the boy) saw him (=the dog) he (=the dog) advanced running to the path

== Information structural properties ==
=== Focus in declaratives ===
In a neutral sentence, the subject and the non-referential object are unmarked with respect to information structure.

Joachim yuwisi’k kut-di’
Joachim rice do-3SG.M
'Joachim has cooked rice'

When the subject is focused, the focus marker -a (masculine, -ak for feminine) marks the masculine subject. The verb in contrary misses markers for person and grammatical gender and is marked with the focus marker -a instead. Even though both focus markers have the same form, their origin is different and they have different allomorphs. The following sentence is the answer to the question 'Who cooked rice?'.

Joachim-a yuwisi’k kuk'-a
Joachim-FOC rice do-FOC
'Joachim has cooked rice'

When a non-subject is focused, the verb is marked with respect to person and grammatical gender of the subject in addition to focus. The focus constituent is focus-marked and precedes the verb, whereas non-focused constituents can follow the verb (subject as afterthought). The following sentence is the answer to the question 'What did Joachim cook?'.

Joachim yuwisi’k'-a kut-d-a
Joachim rice-FOC do-3SG.M-FOC
'Joachim has cooked rice'

In all these cases, the marking of noun and verb indicates that the focus constructions must have emerged from cleft-constructions (hence the alternative glossing in the following examples with 3SG and SR). Sentences marked with respect to focus generally have a smaller potential for inflection than neutral sentences. Therefore, some grammatical categories (like optative, imperative) which are expressed by suffixation can not be realised when the sentence is marked with respect to focus.

=== Focus in questions ===
Questions which are asking for the subject or direct object need to be focus-marked, while the answers can be focused or neutral.

kada-na yuwisi’k kuk’-a?
who-3SG.M rice do-SR
'Who has cooked rice?'

Joachim mi’da-na kut-d-a?
Joachim what-FOC do-3SG.M-FOC
'What has Joachim done?'

To mark the questions, the allomorphs -na (masc.) and -lak (fem.) are used for focus marking. Inanimate referents are always marked with -na. This can be explained by assuming that the question words used to be marked twice with the demonstrative pronouns -(a)n (masc.) and -(a)t (fem.), which due to phonological processes evolved to the current focus suffixes.

(6) kada-an > kadan > kadan-an > kadana
(7) kada-at > kadat > kadat-at > kadalat > kadalak

If it is not asked for the subject or the direct object, another possibility is a neutral question.

kada-na kwi-m-a?
who-3SG.M give-2SG.M-SR
'Whom did you give it to?'

kada-kak kwi-mi'n?
who-DAT give-2SG.M
'Whom did you give it to?'

=== Negated focus sentences ===
In negated sentences, focus marking causes extraordinary structures. The negation particle ana which is placed before the verb receives a congruency marker. The following examples illustrate this with focus on the subject.

Kerol ana ya-a-li'
Kerol NEG come-PRS-3SG.F
'Kerol is not coming.'

Kerol-ak ya-li’-ka
Kerol-3SG.F come-IPFV-PRS:S
'Kerol is coming.'

Kerol ana-li' ya-li’-ka
Kerol NEG-3SG.F come-IPFV-PRS:SR
'Kerol is coming.'

In sentences, in which the predicate is negated, the negation is carried out periphrastically with -lapman 'without'.

Kerol-ak ya-lapman yi-li’-l-a
Kerol-3SG.F come-without go-IPFV-3SG.F-SR
'Kerol has not come (yet)’ or ‘It’s Kerol who has not come.'

== Sample Text ==
"The Market"
Iatmul	Wegani’ba yika vaala kuka kawika wakkaika, glasi’k wudi da klaka gi’li’laa, nyiga vicholaa kaami taakadi. Sawasi’ lattaa kaami kladi mi’na, Sawasi’ nau kukka, glasi’k wudi da kukka, ni’nadi nyimeikak kwika gi’li’ka wega gi’li’di’, vaala kulaa valayakiyadi. Valayalaa ki’ki’da kukka gi’li’laa ki’ka gi’li’laa, gla’bu jwaakkiyadi gepma. Ak taba gi’li’kali’.
IPA	[weᵑganɨᵐba jiga βaːla kuga kawiga wakai̯ga, ᵑglasɨk wuⁿdi ⁿda klaga ᵑgɨlɨlaː, ɲiᵑga βit͡ʃolaː kaːmi taːgaⁿdi. sawasɨ lataː kaːmi klaⁿdi mɨna, sawasɨ naʊ̯ kuka, ᵑglasɨk wuⁿdi ⁿda kuka, nɨnaⁿdi ɲimei̯gak kwiga ᵑgɨlɨga weᵑga ᵑgɨlɨⁿdɨ, βaːla kulaː βalajagijaⁿdi. βalayalaː kɨgɨⁿda kuka ᵑgɨlɨlaː kɨga ᵑgɨlɨaː, ᵑglaˀᵐbu ⁿd͡ʒaːkijaⁿdi ᵑgepma. ak taᵐba ᵑgɨlɨgalɨ.]
English	The market people get into their canoes, paddle to the other shore, and go up [to the market], after they finish buying fruits and vegetables, they put a mat on the ground and display their fish. The Sawos get up, and once they've got their fish, the Sawos take the sago, they take the fruits, and once they finish giving them to our mothers, the market is over, and [people] will get into their canoes and return. When they've arrived, they finish preparing food and finish eating, they will walk around in the village in the afternoon. That's how it ends.

== See also ==
- Iatmul people
- Ndu languages
- Yimas-Iatmul Pidgin
- Gerd Jendraschek

== Sources ==
- Jendraschek, Gerd (2012). A grammar of Iatmul. University of Regensburg. OCLC 816072585.
- Foley, William (1986). The Papuan Languages of New Guinea. Cambridge: Cambridge University Press. ISBN 0-521-28621-2.
