= Klaus Gehrig =

German businessman

- Born: 1948 (age 77–78)
- Title: CEO, Schwarz Gruppe
- Term: 2004–
- Predecessor: Dieter Schwarz

Klaus Gehrig (born 1948) is a German businessman, the CEO of Schwarz Gruppe, a private family-owned German retail group that owns Lidl and Kaufland, and is the largest retailer in Europe. Gehrig succeeded company owner Dieter Schwarz as CEO of Lidl in 2004.
