= Gerard van Schagen =

Dutch cartographer (c. 1642 – 1724)

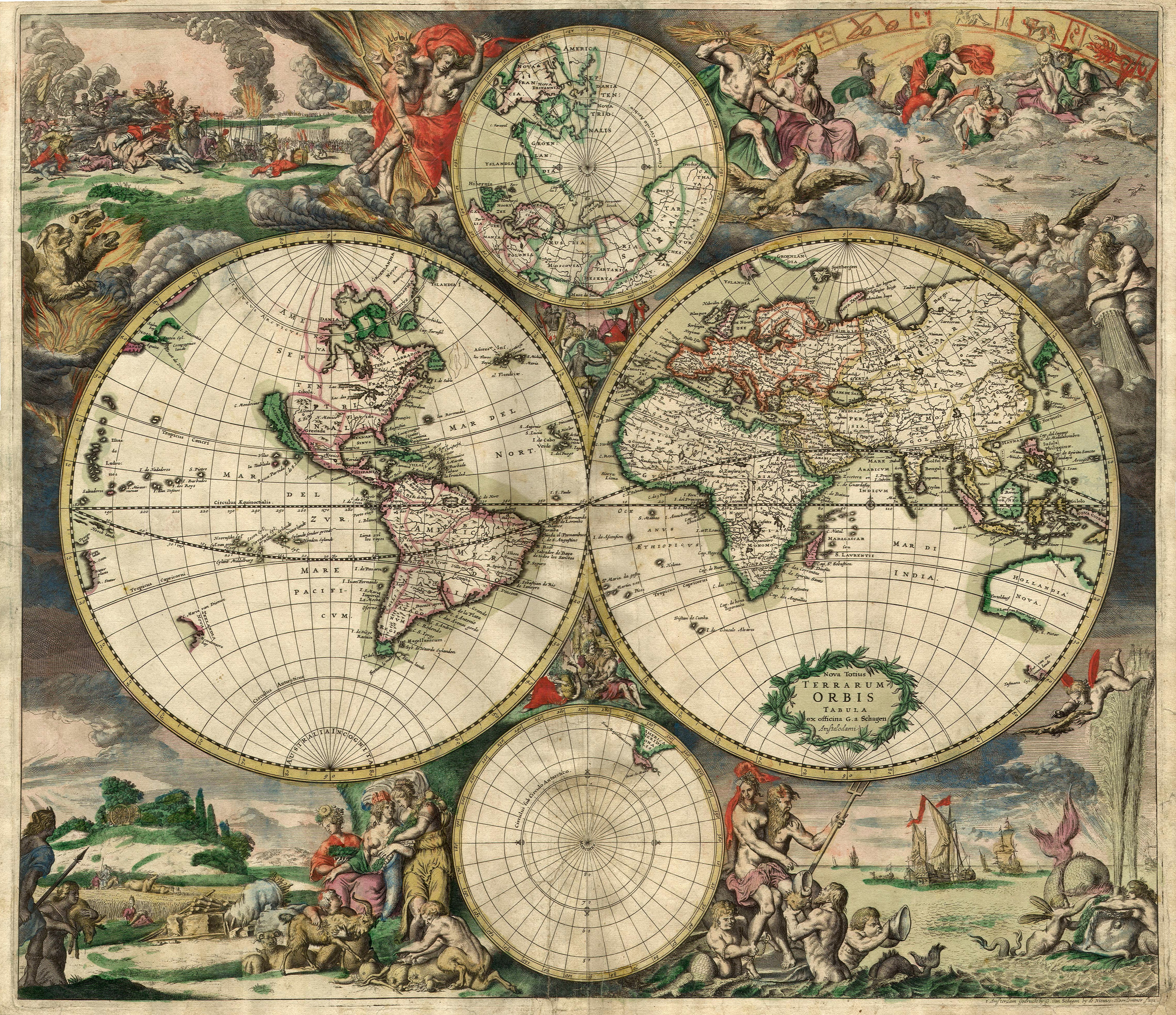
Van Schagen's map of the world, 1689

Gerrit Lucasz van Schagen or Schaagen (Latinised as Gerardus a Schagen; c. 1642 – c. March 1724) was an engraver and cartographer from Amsterdam, known for his exquisite reproductions of maps, particularly of those by Nicolaes Visscher I and Frederick de Wit. He lived and worked in Amsterdam, on the Haarlemmerdijk near the New Haarlem sluice at the house with the sign "In de Stuurman".

== Biography ==
The surname suggests that Gerrit or his father Lucas may have been born in Schagen. On 24 April 1677 he married Gertruij Govers van Schendel/Schijndel. At this occasion he was "from Amsterdam, plaetsnijder (engraver) from profession, 35 years old, and living on the Haarlemmerdijk." After the death of Geertruij in September 1690, Gerrit, as widower of Geertruij and still living on the Haarlemmerdijk, remarried on 7 October 1695 with the 34-year old Anna Cornelis. Gerrit and Anna baptized children between 1697 and 1701 and together were witnesses at other baptisms as late as June 1712.

== Career ==
Gerrit Lucasz van Schagen worked in Amsterdam as an engraver and publisher of maps during the late seventeenth and early eighteenth centuries. His work focused largely on producing carefully engraved versions of maps originally created by well-known Amsterdam cartographers such as Nicolaes Visscher I and Frederick de Wit. In the Amsterdam map trade of the period, it was common for engravers to reproduce or adapt successful maps so that they could continue to circulate in new printings and formats.

Van Schagen produced a number of engraved maps of the world and of individual continents. One of his best known works is a decorative double-hemisphere world map published in 1689. The map presents the eastern and western hemispheres in two large circular projections and is surrounded by elaborate decorative engraving typical of Dutch cartography of the period, including allegorical figures representing the four continents. Like many maps produced in Amsterdam in the late seventeenth century, it drew heavily on earlier cartographic models while adding ornamental cartouches and richly engraved border decoration.

Working from his premises on the Haarlemmerdijk in Amsterdam, van Schagen engraved and sold maps that helped keep earlier Dutch cartographic designs in circulation during the late seventeenth century.

== Death ==
A Gerrit van Schagen was buried 19 March 1724 at the Karthuizer cemetery in Amsterdam.
