= Gerardus Clark =

American lawyer (1786–1860)

- Born: January 20, 1786; New Milford, Connecticut Colony
- Died: August 23, 1860 (aged 74); New Rochelle, New York, U.S.
- Resting place: New Milford, Connecticut, U.S.
- Education: Yale College
- Occupation: Lawyer
- Years active: 1804–1860
- Spouse: Ann Maria Bogert (m. 1825)
- Children: 2

Gerardus Clark (January 20, 1786 – August 23, 1860) was an American lawyer from New York City.

== Early life ==
Gerardus Clark was born on January 20, 1786, in New Milford, Connecticut, to Annis (née Bostwick) and William Clark. He attended Yale College and was amanuensis to Timothy Dwight IV who was then writing Travels in New England and New York. He graduated in 1804.

== Career ==
Following graduation, Clark moved to New York City and studied law in the office of John G. Bogert. He was admitted to the bar in New York in 1813. He continued practicing law in New York City for the remainder of his life. He was at one time president of the Board of Education of the City of New York. While in that role, he wrote a paper defending the use of the Bible in common schools.

== Personal life ==
In 1825, Clark married Ann Maria Bogert of New York. They had two children. He lived on 9th Street and Broadway in Manhattan. In 1850, Clark moved to New Rochelle. He was a vestryman of Trinity Church in New Rochelle.

Clark died on August 23, 1860, in New Rochelle. He was buried in New Milford.
