= Gerd Greune =

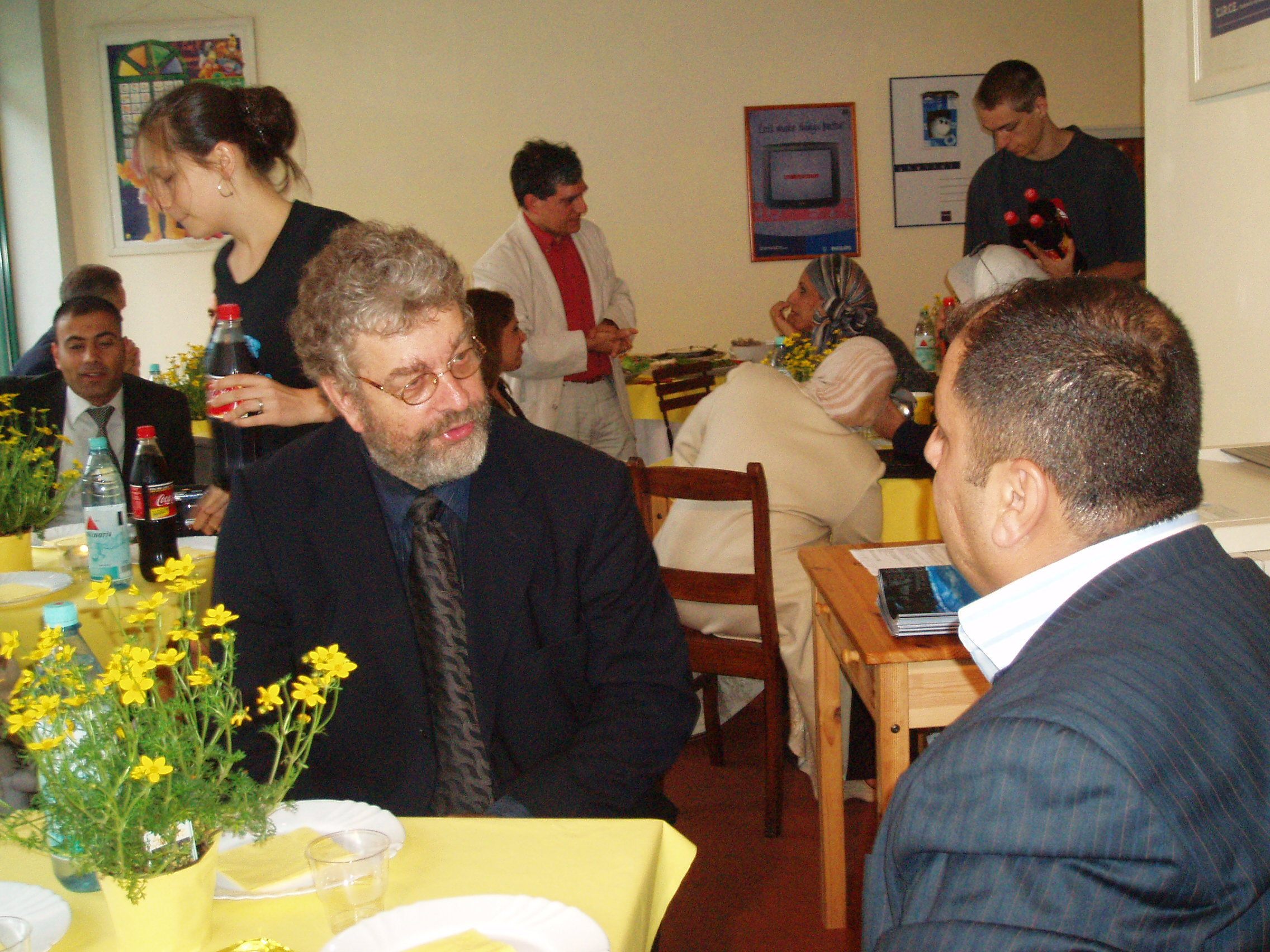
Gerd Greune

Gerd Greune (15 March 1949 in Hannover – 24 August 2012 in Hamburg, Germany) was the president of the Institute for International Assistance and Solidarity (IFIAS).

He graduated as a teacher but discovered politics very early. The right to conscientious objection was his first political issue, developing into a general involvement in the German and international Peace movement and campaigning against the stationing of nuclear weapons in Europe and nuclear arms in general. From 1986 to 1997 he worked as a political adviser to the Executive Board of the Social-Democratic Party of Germany. He founded the IFIAS Brussels in 1997.

His interests were particularly Human Rights, Freedom of Media, anti-militarisation and conflict resolution. As President of IFIAS, he represented the organisation and was responsible, together with the Board, for the general directions of IFIAS projects. He worked as adviser on European projects in Bonn and Brussels.

Gerd Greune had five children.
