= Gerard Brackx =

Belgian businessman (1931-2011)

- Born: 1931; Ostend
- Died: 19 September 2011 (aged 79–80); Ostend
- Occupation: Businessman
- Spouse: Diane Provoost

Gerardus "Gerard" Brackx (1931 in Ostend – 19 September 2011) was a Belgian businessman, pioneer of the Belgian travel business and founder of Jetair. His father was a Catholic businessman who owned a factory which produced washing machines and bicycles. Gerard was the seventh child out of nine. On the verge of World War II, his father died of pneumonia and Gerard had to start help working at the age of 16 to earn money for his family.

== Career ==
At the age of 24, after finishing school and serving in the army (part of which he spent in Kassel, Germany), he dreamt of a future in cars and travel. He married Diane Provoost, whose father had a garage where he started his career as a salesman. He worked there for five years when he saw the first busses appear in the garage. In 1956, together with his brother-in-law, Roger Provoost, he started organizing bus travels during the summer months (when the buses stood idle) through Reiskantoren Royal Tours for British tourists visiting the Belgian coast. In addition he started offering tours for Flemings to the English coast across the English Channel.

In 1958, with the Brussels World's Fair came the breakthrough and in addition he started offering journeys to Lourdes, Tyrol and the Costa Brava. At the end of the sixties, he was the first Belgian tour operator who offered organised air travel in association with Sabena to Benidorm (Spain). For many years he would be known as Mijnheer Benidorm (Mister Benidorm) as he discovered Benidorm as a vacation resort during the sixties. In 1970, he opened his own Hotel Belroy in Benidorm and until 1978 would remain the only Belgian tour operator who offered flight vacations to Benidorm. In 1996, he sold Jetair to the German travel organization Touristik Union International (TUI).

During his last years, Brackx occupied himself with the real estate of the family holding Immobra. He died in Ostend on 19 September 2011, aged 80 and was buried there on 24 September.

== Sources ==
- Gerard Brackx
- De ontdekker van Benidorm
