= Gerd Enequist =

Swedish geographer

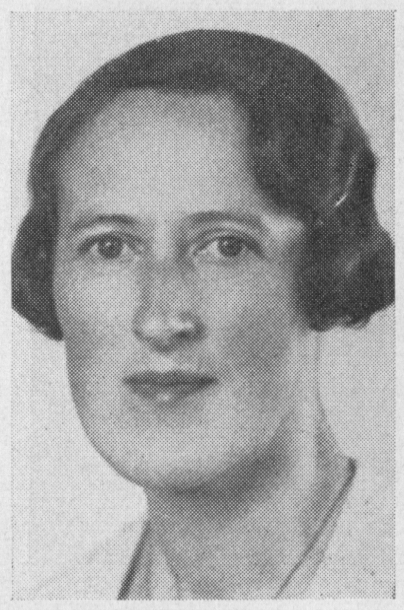
- Born: 24 February 1903; Luleå, Sweden
- Died: 21 May 1989 (aged 86); Uppsala, Sweden
- Burial place: Visby, Sweden
- Education: Uppsala University
- Occupations: Geographer, professor
- Known for: First female professor at Uppsala University

Gerd Margareta Enequist (24 February 1903 in Luleå – 21 May 1989 in Uppsala), was a Swedish geographer. In 1949, she was the first Swede to be named a professor of cultural geography and became the first female professor at Uppsala University.

== Biography ==
Enequist was the daughter of the land rent master Axel Enequist and Anna Hederstedt. In the town of her birth, girls were denied the opportunity to gain a higher education so, unlike her three brothers, Gerd was sent to Gothenburg to live with a relative and receive private instruction. After completing her studies in 1923, she passed the exams earning a folk school teacher's degree in Luleå and moved to Norrbotten, where she was hired as a teacher. It was there that she first became interested in Nordic languages and the dialects of the Torneälv region, which in turn inspired her to begin studying the languages, history and literary history of the area at Uppsala University, where she received her Master's degree in 1929.

Enequist earned a licentiate in philosophy in 1934 and a doctor of philosophy in 1937 with her dissertation titled: The Villages of Nedre Luledalen. A Cultural Geographical Study, which discussed the Norrbotten region and its population, buildings and businesses. Soon she became the first female professor at Uppsala University, first as an associate professor of geography and then professor of cultural geography and economic geography between 1949 and 1968, acting since 1947.

=== Gerd's triangular diagram ===
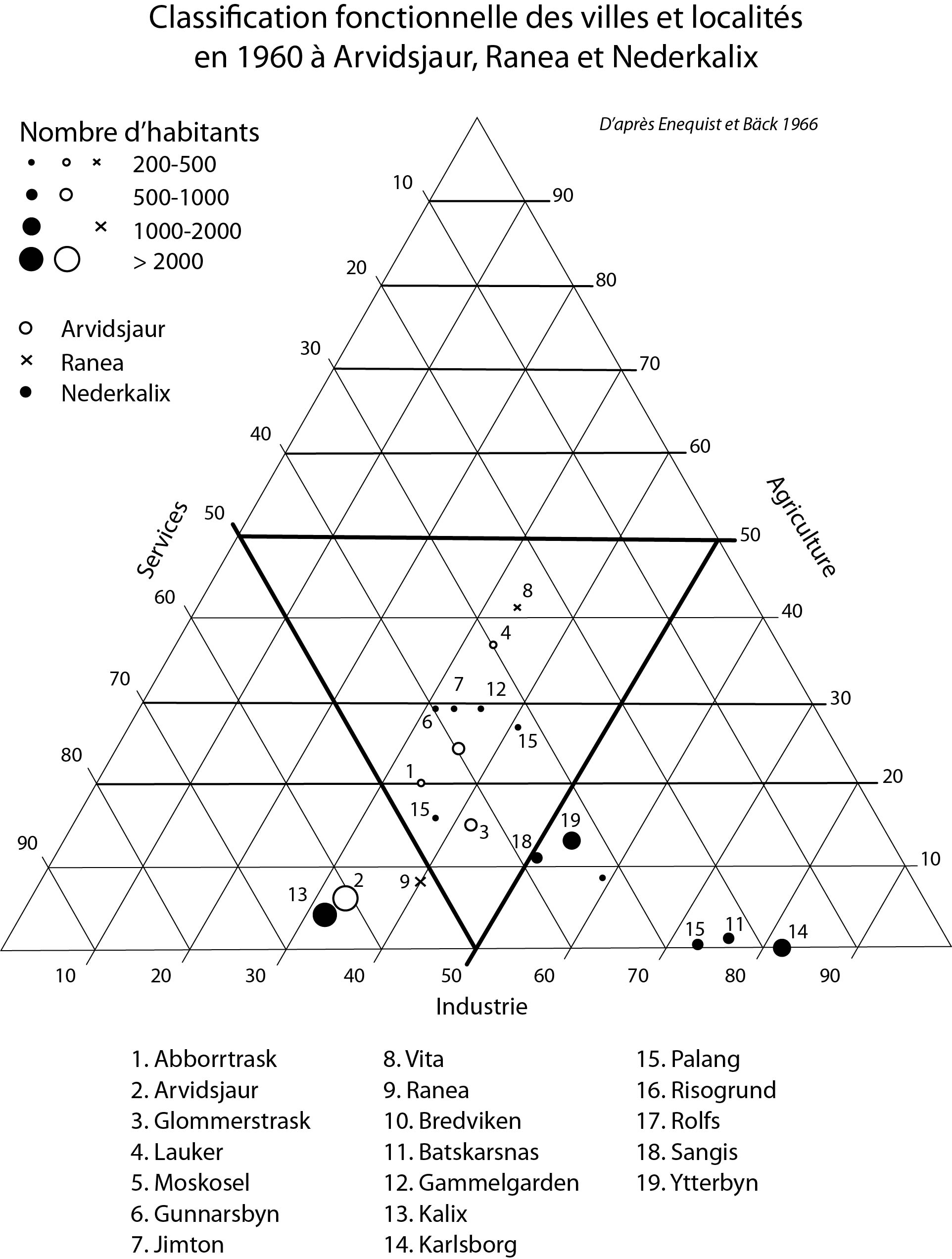
Triangular diagram published by Enequist and Bäck in 1966.

The triangular diagram allows three data items to be compared at the same time, presented as percentages on a triangle. In their 1966 article, Enequist and Lennart Bäck first applied this method to cartography. The triangular diagram makes it possible to represent several territories according to three values, compare them and then apply a classification. The diagram shown concerns the percentage of jobs in three main groups: agriculture, industry and services, comparing a small number of towns. This representation allows readers to understand regional variations, the structuring of residential areas and the economic dominance of an urban unit.

=== Later years ===
Enequist was a member of the delegation for road planning 1954–1958 and of the editorial committee for Atlas over Sweden, for which she contributed maps that described population, settlements and business life. She was an inspector at the municipal girls' school in Uppsala and the Uppsala higher elementary school, and she was a member of the church council 1951–1957.

She died in 1989 in Uppsala and is buried in the Östra cemetery in Visby.

== Selected awards ==
Enequist became a corresponding member of the Austrian Society for the Promotion of Regional Research and Planning in 1955, a member of the Royal Humanistic Science Society in Uppsala in 1956, of the Royal Skyttean Society in 1956, an honorary member of the Uppland Antiquities Association in 1976 and of the Olaus Magnus Society in 1976.

She was named an honorary doctor of philosophy at Umeå University 1982 and was a member of the Order of the Polar Star.
