= Gerd Becker (handballer) =

German handball player (born 1953)

Personal information
- Nationality: German
- Born: 12 April 1953 (age 73) Minden, Germany
- Height: 188 cm (74 in)

Sport
- Sport: Handball
- Position: Centre back

Youth career
- Years: Team
- –: TuS Minderheide
- 1970-1972: TSV Grün-Weiß Dankersen

Senior clubs
- Years: Team
- 1972-1981: TSV Grün-Weiß Dankersen
National team
Years	Team	Apps	(Gls)
1974-1981	Germany	31	(19)

Gerd Becker (born 12 April 1953) is a former West German handball player who competed in the 1976 Summer Olympics.

In 1976 he was part of the West German team which finished fourth in the Olympic tournament. He played five matches and scored one goal.
