= Gerhold =

Gerhold is both a surname and a given name. Notable people with the name include:

- Walther Gerhold (1921–2013), German Kriegsmarine officer
- Gerhold K. Becker (born 1943), German philosopher
