= Gehrig (surname) =

Gehrig is a German surname. Notable people with the surname include:

- Adelaide Gehrig (1887–1944), American fencer
- Eleanor Gehrig (1904–1984), American philanthropist
- Eric Gehrig (born 1987), American soccer player
- Fraser Gehrig (born 1976), Australian rules footballer
- Hans Gehrig (1929–1989), Canadian bobsledder
- Kim Gehrig, Australian director
- Klaus Gehrig (born 1948), German businessman
- Lou Gehrig (1903–1941), American baseball player
- Phil Gehrig (1935–1993), Australian rules footballer

== See also ==
- 5891 Gehrig, a main-belt asteroid named for Lou Gehrig
