= Gerwin =

Gerwin is a Dutch masculine given name of Germanic origin. The name is traditionally analysed as a dithematic (two-stem) Germanic compound meaning “spear-friend”, from ger (“spear”) and win (“friend”).

The name is attested primarily in the Netherlands, where it occurs predominantly as a male given name. Its linguistic roots reflect early Germanic naming traditions in the Low Countries.

It has been suggested that the place name Gerwen (North Brabant) derives from a personal name of this type, traditionally interpreted as “Gerwin’s home” (from Gerwins heim).

== Notable people ==
- Gerwin Pardoel (born 1981), Dutch rapper known as Gers
- Gerwin van der Werf (born 1969), Dutch novelist and composer

== See also ==
- Gervin
- Gerwen
