= Gering (surname) =

Gering is a surname. Notable people with the surname include:

- Galen Gering (born 1971), American actor
- Giles Gering, an artist at the court of King Henry VIII of England
- Jurij Gering, politician in the Holy Roman Empire, mayor of Ljubljana in 1524
- Rudi Gering (1917 – 1998 or 1999), German ski jumper
- Ulrich Gering (died 1510), one of three partners who established the first printing press in France
