= Gerd Heusch =

German physician, physiologist, and professor (born 1955)

- Born: May 20, 1955 (age 71); Bonn, West Germany

Gerd Heusch (born May 20, 1955, in Bonn) is a German physician and physiologist. From 1989 until 2024 he was professor and chair of the Institute for Pathophysiology at the University of Essen Medical School.

== Biography ==
Heusch attended the Medical Schools at the Universities of Düsseldorf and Bonn, where he graduated in 1979 and received his MD degree in 1980. Following obligatory military service as medical officer, he was postdoctoral fellow in the Department of Physiology at the University of Düsseldorf Medical School where he completed his PhD in 1985. From 1985 to 1986 Heusch was research cardiologist at the University of California, San Diego under the mentorship of Dr. John Ross Jr. From 1986 to 1989 Heusch held a Heisenberg scholarship from the German Research Foundation in the Department of Physiology and the Clinic of Cardiology (Prof. Dr. Franz Loogen) at the University of Düsseldorf Medical School. From 1989 until 2024 he was professor and chair of the Institute for Pathophysiology at the University of Essen Medical School. From 1999 to 2000 he spent a sabbatical in the Department of Physiology at the University of Southern Alabama, Mobile where he is adjunct professor since. From 2014 to 2022 Heusch was scientific chief executive of the West German Heart and Vascular Center Essen. Heusch served as president of the European Section of the International Society for Heart Research from 2002 to 2005 and as president of the German Cardiac Society from 2007 to 2009. As president of the German Cardiac Society Heusch put particular emphasis on the establishment of Chest Pain Units to fight myocardial infarction – today there are more than 300 Chest Pain Units in Germany. From 2008 to 2016 Heusch served on the medical review board of the German Research Foundation, from 2012 to 2016 as its speaker. Heusch is editor of Basic Research in Cardiology since 1992; he has been and is member of the editorial board of a number of prestigious journals, such as Circulation Research, Circulation, Journal of the American College of Cardiology, European Heart Journal, Cardiovascular Research and American Journal of Physiology. Heusch is fellow of the Royal College of Physicians (London) since 2006 and regular member of the North Rhine-Westphalian Academy of Sciences and Arts since 2012, speaker of its medical members since 2019, and vice president for natural sciences and medicine since 2023. In 2022 he was elected as member of the Academia Europaea.

== Research ==
Heusch's research focus is on coronary blood flow and the pathophysiology of myocardial ischemia and reperfusion. He first reported that the coronary circulation is not maximally dilated during myocardial ischemia, but subject to active vasoconstriction through alpha-adrenergic effects of the sympathetic innervation. He characterized in detail the hemodynamic, morphological, metabolic and molecular features of hibernating myocardium and of coronary microembolization. In recent years, he analyzed the signal transduction of ischemic conditioning. The translation of preclinical data to clinical practice is of particular importance to him, and he succeeded to translate remote ischemic conditioning to patients undergoing bypass surgery. Heusch published more than 600 original and review articles in respected international journals, his h-index is triple digit. In 2018, 2019, 2020, 2021, 2022, and 2023 he was awarded as "Highly Cited Researcher".

Seven collaborators of Heusch received the habilitation degree, his long-term collaborator Rainer Schulz is professor and chair of the Department of Physiology at the University of Giessen Medical School since 2011, his long-term collaborator Bodo Levkau is professor and chair of the Institute of Molecular Medicine of the University of Düsseldorf Medical School since 2020, his long-term collaborator Petra Kleinbongard is professor for cardioprotection at the University of Duisburg-Essen Medical School since 2020.

== Awards and honors ==
Heusch received an honor's doctorate from the Medical Academy Nishnij Novgorod/Russia in 2000, an honor's professorship from Tangshan Medical College/China in 2006, and an honor's doctorate from the Semmelweis University in Budapest, Hungary in 2023. In 2012, he was awarded the federal cross of merit, in 2017 the order of merit of the state North Rhine-Westphalia, and in 2023 the federal cross of merit 1. class for his merits on the research on and the fight against myocardial infarction

== Further awards ==
- Edens-Award, University of Düsseldorf (1985)
- Wulf-Vater-Award, Johannes-Gutenberg-University Mainz (1997)
- Fritz-Acker-Award, German Cardiac Society (1998)
- Basic Science Lecture and Silver Medal, European Society of Cardiology (2002)
- Keith-Reimer Award, International Society for Heart Research (2003)
- Paul-Morawitz-Award, German Cardiac Society (2004)
- Greats of Cardiology-Award, University Heart Center Freiburg/Bad Krozingen (2008)
- Hans-Peter-Krayenbühl-Award, International Academy of Cardiology (2010)
- Golden Badge of Honor, German Cardiac Society (2011)
- William-Harvey Lecture and Silver Medal, European Society of Cardiology (2012)
- Distinguished Leader Award, International Society for Heart Research (2014)
- Carl-Ludwig-Medal of Honor, German Cardiac Society (2017)
- Carl-Wiggers Award, American Physiological Society (2017)
- Medal of Merit, European Section of the International Society for Heart Research (2017).
- Franz-Loogen-Award, German Cardiac Society (2022)
- Naranjan Dhalla award, International Academy of Cardiovascular Sciences (2023)
