= Gerd Becker (chemist) =

German chemist (1940–2017)

Gerd Becker (3 May 1940 – 10 January 2017) was a German chemist.

== Biography ==
Becker was born in Eschwege, Germany on 3 May 1940. He held a chair of inorganic chemistry at the University of Stuttgart. In 1974 he synthesized the first localized phosphaalkene. Becker died on 10 January 2017, at the age of 76.

== Sources ==
- Entry on Becker's death
