= Gérard =

- Pronunciation: French: [ʒeʁaʁ]
- Gender: male

Origin
- Origin: Germanic
- Meaning: strong and brave spear-wearer
- Region of origin: Common in French-speaking countries

Other names
- Related names: Gerard Gerhar(d)t, Geert, Gerhardus, Girard, Gerardo, Gertje, Gerrit, Jerry/Gerry.

Gérard (French: [ʒeʁaʁ]) is a French masculine given name and surname of Germanic origin, variations of which exist in many Germanic and Romance languages. Like many other early Germanic names, it is dithematic, consisting of two meaningful constituents put together. In this case, those constituents are gari > ger- (meaning 'spear') and -hard (meaning 'hard/strong/brave'). The English cognate of Gérard is Gerard.

== As a given name ==
- Gérard Adanhoumé (born 1986), Beninese footballer
- Gérard Araud (born 1953), French diplomat
- Gérard Asselin (1950–2013), Canadian politician
- Gérard Audran (1640–1703), French engraver
- Gérard Badini (1931–2025), French jazz saxophonist and pianist
- Gérard Bailly (born 1940), French politician
- Gérard Balanche (born 1968), Swiss ski jumper
- Gérard Banide (born 1936), French football coach
- Gérard Bapt (born 1946), French politician
- Gérard Barray (1931–2024), French actor
- Gérard Barreaux (1948–2010), French accordionist, composer and actor
- Gerard Béhague (1937–2005), French-born American ethnomusicologist
- Gérard Bélanger (born 1940), Canadian economist and educator
- Gérard Berliner (1956–2010), French actor and composer
- Gérard Berry (born 1948), French computer scientist
- Gérard Bessette (1920–2005), Canadian author and educator
- Gérard Bessière (1928–2024), French author and priest
- Gérard Biguet (born 1946), French football referee
- Gérard Binet (born 1955), Canadian politician
- Gérard Bitsindou (1941–2012), Congolese politician and judge
- Gérard Blain (1930-2000), French actor and film director
- Gérard Blanc (1947–2009), French pop singer and guitarist
- Gérard Blitz (1912–1990), Belgian water polo player, Yogi and entrepreneur
- Gérard Blitz (1901–1979), Belgian swimmer and water polo player
- Gérard Bonnevie (born 1952), French alpine skier
- Gérard Bouchard (born 1943), Canadian historian, sociologist and writer
- Gérard Bougrier (born 1944), French civil servant
- Gérard Boulanger (1948–2018), French politician, lawyer and human rights activist
- Gérard Brach (1927–2006), French screenwriter
- Gérard Brachet (born 1944) French aerospace engineer
- Gérard Brosselin (1870–1905), French tennis player
- Gérard Bruchési (born 1931), Canadian politician and insurance broker
- Gérard Buquet (born 1954), French conductor and composer
- Gérard Buscher (born 1960), French football player and manager
- Gérard Calvet (1927–2008), French Catholic abbot
- Gérard Calvi (1922–2015), French composer
- Gérard d'Aboville (born 1945) French rower, first man to row across two oceans solo
- Gérard Thibault d'Anvers (c.1574–1627), Dutch fencing master and author
- Gérard de Balorre (1899–1974), French equestrian
- Gérard of Brogne (c.895–959), Belgian Catholic abbot
- Gérard Le Cam (born 1954), French politician
- Gérard Caron (1916–1986), Canadian organist and pianist
- Gérard Caron (1938–2020), French advertiser and designer
- Gérard Caussé (born 1948), French violist
- Gérard Cauvin (died 1531), French father
- Gérard César (1934–2024), French politician
- Gérard Chaliand (1934–2025), French expert in geopolitics, and poet
- Gérard Chapdelaine (1935–1994), Canadian politician and lawyer
- Gérard Charasse (1944–2023), French politician
- Gérard Cherpion (born 1948), French politician
- Gérard Cholley (born 1945), French rugby player
- Gérard Cochet (1888–1969), French illustrator
- Gérard Collomb (1947–2023), French politician from Lyon
- Gérard Cooreman (1852–1926), Belgian politician
- Gérard Corbiau (born 1941), Belgian film director
- Gérard de Cortanze (born 1948), French writer, essayist, translator and literary critic
- Gérard Coste (born 1939), French painter and diplomat
- Gérard Côté (1913–1993), Canadian marathon runner
- Gérard de Courcelles (1889–1927), French racing driver
- Gérard Cournoyer (1912–1973), Canadian politician and lawyer
- Gérard Crombac (1929–2005), Swiss auto-racing journalist
- Gérard Dagon (1936-2011), French evangelical Protestant pastor, teacher, author, publisher anti-cult activist
- Gérard Darmon (born 1948), French actor and singer
- Gérard Darrieu (1925–2004), French actor
- Gérard Daucourt (born 1941), Swiss Catholic bishop
- Gérard Debreu (1921–2004), French economist and mathematician
- Gérard Delbeke (1903-1977), Belgian footballer
- Gérard Deltell (born 1964), Canadian politician
- Gérard Depardieu (born 1948), French-born Russian actor and film-maker
- Gérard Deprez (born 1943), Belgian politician
- Gérard Dériot (born 1944), French politician
- Gérard Desargues (1591–1661), French mathematician and engineer
- Gérard Deschamps (born 1937), French contemporary artist
- Gérard Paul Deshayes (1795–1875), French geologist and conchologist
- Gérard Desrosiers (1919–2016), Canadian physician and library founder from Quebec
- Gérard Devos (1903-1972), Belgian footballer
- Gérard Diffloth (born 1939), French linguist
- Gérard Dionne (1919–2020), Canadian Catholic Bishop
- Gérard Ducarouge (1941–2015), French race car designer
- Gérard Dufresne (1918–2013), Canadian politician and military officer
- Gérard Duquet (1909–1986), Canadian politician
- Gérard Edelinck (1640–1707), Flemish-born French copper-plate engraver and print publisher
- Gérard Encausse (1865–1916), Spanish-born French physician, hypnotist, popularizer of occultism, founder of the modern Martinist Order
- Gérard Errera (born 1943), French diplomat
- Gérard Farison (1944–2021), French footballer
- Gérard Feldzer (born 1944), French aviator and consultant and aerospace engineer
- Gérard Fenouil (born 1945), French athlete
- Gérard Férey (1941–2017), French chemist and teacher
- Gérard Filion (1909–2005), Canadian businessman and journalist
- Gérard Fombrun (born 1931), Haitian sculptor
- Gérard La Forest (1926–2025), Canadian judge and lawyer
- Gérard Fromanger (1939–2021), French artist
- Gérard Fussman (1940–2022) French indologist
- Gérard Gagnon (fl. 1970s), Canadian priest and translator
- Gérard Garitte (1914–1992), Belgian scientist and historian
- Gérard Garouste (born 1946), French painter, illustrator, and decorator
- Gérard Gasiorowski (1930–1986), French photographer, painter, and fictive artist
- Gérard Gaudron (born 1949), French politician
- Gérard Gauthier (born 1948), Canadian hockey player
- Gérard Geisbusch (born 1988), Luxembourger footballer
- Gérard Genette (1930–2018), French literary theorist
- Gérard Gili (born 1952), French football manager
- Gérard Girouard (1933–2017), Canadian politician
- Gérard Gnanhouan (born 1979), Ivorian footballer
- Gérard Granel (1930–2000), French philosopher and translator
- Gérard Grenier (????-c. 1165 and 1171), French Christian Crusader
- Gérard Grisey (1946–1998), French composer
- Gérard Gropaiz (1943–2012), French swimmer
- Gérard Guillaumaud (1961–2006), French Air Force test pilot
- Gérard Hallet (born 1946), French footballer
- Gérard Hamel (born 1945), French politician
- Gérard Hausser (1941–2025), French footballer
- Gérard Hekking (1879–1942), French cellist
- Gérard Hernandez (born 1933), Spanish-born French film, television and voice actor
- Gérard Hérold (1935–1993), French actor
- Gérard Hoarau (1950–1985), Seychellois politician
- Gérard Holtz (born 1946), French sports journalist
- Gérard Houllier (1947–2020), French football manager
- Gérard Huet (born 1947), French computer scientist
- Gérard Jaffrès (born 1956), French singer, writer and performer
- Gérard Janvion (born 1953), French footballer
- Gérard Jarry (1936–2004), French violinist
- Gérard Jean-Juste (1946–2009), Haitian Catholic priest and rector
- Gérard Joseph (born 1949), Haitian footballer
- Gérard Jugnot (born 1951), French actor, film director, screenwriter and producer
- Gérard Klein (born 1937), French science fiction writer
- Gérard Kobéané (born 1988), Burkinabe sprinter
- Gérard Krawczyk (born 1953), French film director
- Gérard Labrune (born 1943), French syndicalist
- Gérard de Lally-Tollendal (1751–1830), French politician
- Gérard Lamy (1919–2016), Canadian politician
- Gérard Landry (1914–1989), Argentine actor
- Gérard Lanvin (born 1950), French actor
- Gérard Laprise (1925–2000), Canadian politician
- Gérard Larcher (born 1949), French politician
- Gérard Larrousse (born 1940), French sports car racing, rallying and Formula One driver
- Gérard Latortue (1934–2023), Haitian Prime Minister
- Gérard Laumon (1952–2025), French mathematician
- Gérard Mentor Laurent (1933–2001), Haitian historian and educator
- Gérard Lauzier (1932–2008), French comics author and film director
- Gérard Lebel (1930–2020), Canadian politician
- Gérard Lebovici (1932–1984), French film producer and editor
- Gérard Lefranc (born 1935), French fencer
- Gérard Légaré (1908–1997), Canadian politician
- Gérard Lelièvre (born 1949), French race walker
- Gérard Leman (1851–1920), Belgian military general
- Gérard Lenorman (born 1945), French singer
- Gérard Lesne (born 1956), French opera countertenor
- Gérard D. Levesque (1926–1993), Canadian politician
- Gérard Lifondja (born 1989), Belgian footballer
- Gérard Loiselle (1921–1994), Canadian politician
- Gérard Loncke (1905–1979), Belgian professional road bicycle racer
- Gérard Longuet (born 1946), French politician
- Gérard Lorgeoux (born 1943), French politician
- Gérard, Duke of Lorraine (c. 1030–1070), French Duke of Alsace
- Gérard Magnin (born 1951), French ecologist
- Gérard Majax (1943), French illusionist
- Gérard Manset (born 1945), French singer-songwriter, painter, photographer and writer
- Gérard de la Martinière (born 1943), French businessman
- Gérard Masson (1936–2021), French composer
- Gérard Mendel (1930–2004), French psychoanalyst and psychiatrist
- Gérard Mestrallet (born 1949), French aerospace engineer, businessman
- Gérard Millet (born 1939), French politician
- Gérard Miquel (born 1946), French politician
- Gérard Mourou (born 1944), French physicist and engineer
- Gérard Mulliez (born 1931), French businessman and entrepreneur
- Gérard de Nerval (1808–1855), French poet, essayist and translator
- Gérard Niding (1924–2011), Canadian politician
- Gérard Onesta (born 1960), French politician
- Gérard Kango Ouédraogo (1925–2014), Burkinabé politician
- Gérard Ouellet (1913–1975), Canadian politician
- Gérard Oury (1919– 2006), French film director, actor and screenwriter
- Gérard Pape (born 1955) American composer, author and psychologist
- Gérard Patris (1931−1990), French film and television director
- Gérard Pierre-Charles (1935–2004), Haitian politician
- Gérard Pelletier (1919–1997), Canadian journalist and politician
- Gérard Perrier (1928–2012), French cross country skier
- Gérard Perron (1920–1981), Canadian politician
- Gérard Philipe (1922–1959), French actor
- Gérard Pipart (1933–2013), French fashion designer
- Gérard Pirès (born 1942), French film director and screenwriter
- Gérard Prunier (born 1942), French academic and historian
- Gérard du Puy (????–1389), French Catholic cardinal
- Gérard Rabinovitch (born 1948), French philosopher and sociologist
- Gérard Rancinan (born 1953), French photographer
- Gérard Rinaldi (1943-2012), French singer and actor
- Gérard Roland (born 1954), Belgian economist
- Gérard Roland (born 1981), French footballer
- Gérard Roussel (1500–1550) French cleric and theologian
- Gérard Rousset (fencer) (1921–2000), French fencer
- Gérard Rozenknop (born 1950) French public servant and aerospace engineer
- Gérard Rudolf (born 1966), South African actor
- Gérard Saint (1935–1960), French professional road bicycle racer
- Gérard Schivardi (born 1950), French politician
- Gérard Ernest Schneider (1896–1986), Swiss painter
- Gérard de Sède (1921–2004), French author and supporter of the Action française political movement
- Gérard Séty (1922–1998), French actor
- Gérard Soisson (1935–1983), Luxembourger banker
- Gérard Soler (born 1954), French footballer and coach
- Gérard Solvès (born 1968), French tennis player and coach
- Gérard Souzay (1918–2004), French baritone opera singer
- Gérard Théberge (1930-2000), Canadian ice hockey player
- Gérard Théodore (1920–2012), French military officer and statistician
- Gérard Charles Édouard Thériault (1932–1998), Canadian Air Force General and Chief of the Defence Staff
- Gérard Tremblay (1918–2019), Canadian Catholic bishop
- Gérard Tremblay (born 1950), French race car driver
- Gérard Vachonfrance (1933–2008), French physician
- Gérard de Vaucouleurs (1918–1995), French astronomer
- Gérard Veilleux (born 1942), Canadian businessman, president of the Canadian Broadcasting Corporation
- Gérard Vergnaud (1933–2021), French mathematician, philosopher, educator and psychologist
- Gérard de Villiers (1929–2013), French writer, journalist and editor
- Gérard Voisin (born 1945), French politician
- Gérard Wertheimer (born 1951), French businessman, entrepreneur, racehorse breeder and perfumer
- Gérard Aristote Zaonarivelo, Malagasy politician
- Gilles Gérard Meersseman (1903–1988), Belgian theologian and Catholic Church historian

== As a surname ==
- Gérard (surname)

== See also ==
- Gayrard
- Gerald
- Gerard
- Gerhard
- Gerhardt
- Gerhart (disambiguation)
- Gerrard (disambiguation)
- Girard (disambiguation)
- Guerard (disambiguation)
