= Houssam Nasrawin =

Jordanian businessman

Houssam J. Nasrawin
- Born: Amman, Jordan
- Occupations: Founder and President of Arab Business Leaders
- Known for: President of Arab Business Leaders, CEO of GDC Partners
- Website: arabbusinessleaders.com gdc-partners.com

Houssam Nasrawin (born in Amman, Jordan), is a French-Jordanian entrepreneur. He is the current president and founder of the non-profit organization Arab Business Leaders ("ABL"), the CEO of Gulf Development Company ("GDC Partners") and Director at the Groupement du Patronat Francophone. He is also an international speaker.

== Professional career ==
Nasrawin launched ABL in 2011. The main purpose of the organization is to encourage business and entrepreneurship initiatives in the Middle-East. ABL supports entrepreneurs in the MENA region through a mentorship program and an investment platform that connects entrepreneurs and venture capitalists. It is today active in 37 countries.

In 2016, Nasrawin launched the investment and advisory firm GDC Partners. He is acting as CEO. The firm invests in projects in Europe and in the MENA region and advises international firms to set up in the Persian Gulf countries.

In March 2019, he was appointed by the President Jean Lou Blachier, Vice President for the Middle East of the Groupement du Patronat Francophone, the official French association meant to promote business initiatives between French speaking countries and Francophile countries.

He was the managing partner of Mideast Capital, an advisory firm based in Dubai.

== Fostering entrepreneurship ==
Houssam Nasrawin at the University of Oxford

During his speeches at the Franco-Arab Chamber of Commerce in Paris in June 2017 and at the University of Oxford in July 2017, Nasrawin considered that entrepreneurship is the key solution to solve unemployment in the MENA region. In a contribution published in Entrepreneur Magazine in August 2017, he analysed the measures that should governments in the MENA region put in place to improve the entrepreneurial ecosystem. Among the main actions that need to be taken, there are a better access to financing through government guarantees to banks, co-investments between the private and public sectors, tax incentives for start-ups, better access to education, laws to protect against bankruptcy and a stronger role for women.

== International collaboration ==
In an article published in Forbes Afrique in April 2019, Nasrawin called for a stronger collaboration between Europe, Africa and the Middle East through a “Triangular partnership”. Investors from the Gulf region support European companies to find new markets and growth in Africa - the fastest growing region in the world - mainly through joint-ventures with local entities.

Nasrawin is also involved in cultural dialogues between Europe, Africa and the Middle-East. During an interview on French TV in 2015, he mentioned that Arab countries must focus more on communication and mainly on helping the rest of the countries to understand their culture, which would contribute not only to peace but also to strengthen business relations.

== Education ==
Nasrawin holds a Master in Finance from Audencia Business School (France) and a master's degree in environmental economics from Paris Nanterre University.

== Awards and distinctions ==
- Who's Who in France (entered in 2020)
- African Leadership Magazine award in 2012 (Dubai)
