= Dussourd =

Dussourd is a surname. Notable people with the surname include:

- Auguste Dussourd (born 1996), French squash player
- Jean Dussourd (born 1948), French civil servant
