= Vergnaud =

Vergnaud is a surname. Notable people with the surname include:

- Bernadette Vergnaud (born 1950), French politician
- Gérard Vergnaud (1933–2021), French mathematician, philosopher, educator, and psychologist
- Loïc Vergnaud (born 1978), French para-cyclist
