= Sport auto (disambiguation) =

There are two different notable automobile magazines titled Sport auto, therefore this may refer to:

- Sport auto (France)
- sport auto (Germany)
