= Arab business leaders =

Non-profit organization

Arab Business Leaders
- Company type: Business platform
- Founded: 2015
- Founder: Houssam Nasrawin (current president)
- Website: arabbusinessleaders.com

Arab Business Leaders (known also as ABL) is an independent business non-profit organization founded by Houssam Nasrawin. ABL has representatives and partners in 37 countries in Africa, Asia, Europe, and Middle East.

Since its inception in 2011, the organization has been active to encourage international initiatives with the Middle-East mainly by encouraging entrepreneurship initiatives and supporting business initiatives in the region.

== Entrepreneurship programs ==
ABL has launched in 2015, an investment platform to support entrepreneurs from the MENA region to develop their projects Entrepreneurship programs also include an incubator meant to support women entrepreneurs in the Arab countries.

== Connecting entrepreneurs ==
ABL’s first mission is to support Arab entrepreneurs and governments to connect to those in the rest of the world. This is mainly done through roadshows of business delegations or business events. ABL has organized more than 35 events since 2011 in Dubai, Abu Dhabi, Amman, Doha, Paris, Luxembourg, London and Brussels.
