= Louis Meznarie =

French engineer (1930–2020)

Louis Meznarie (14 January 1930 – 6 August 2020) was a French engine expert and a team owner entrant to 24 Hours of Le Mans.

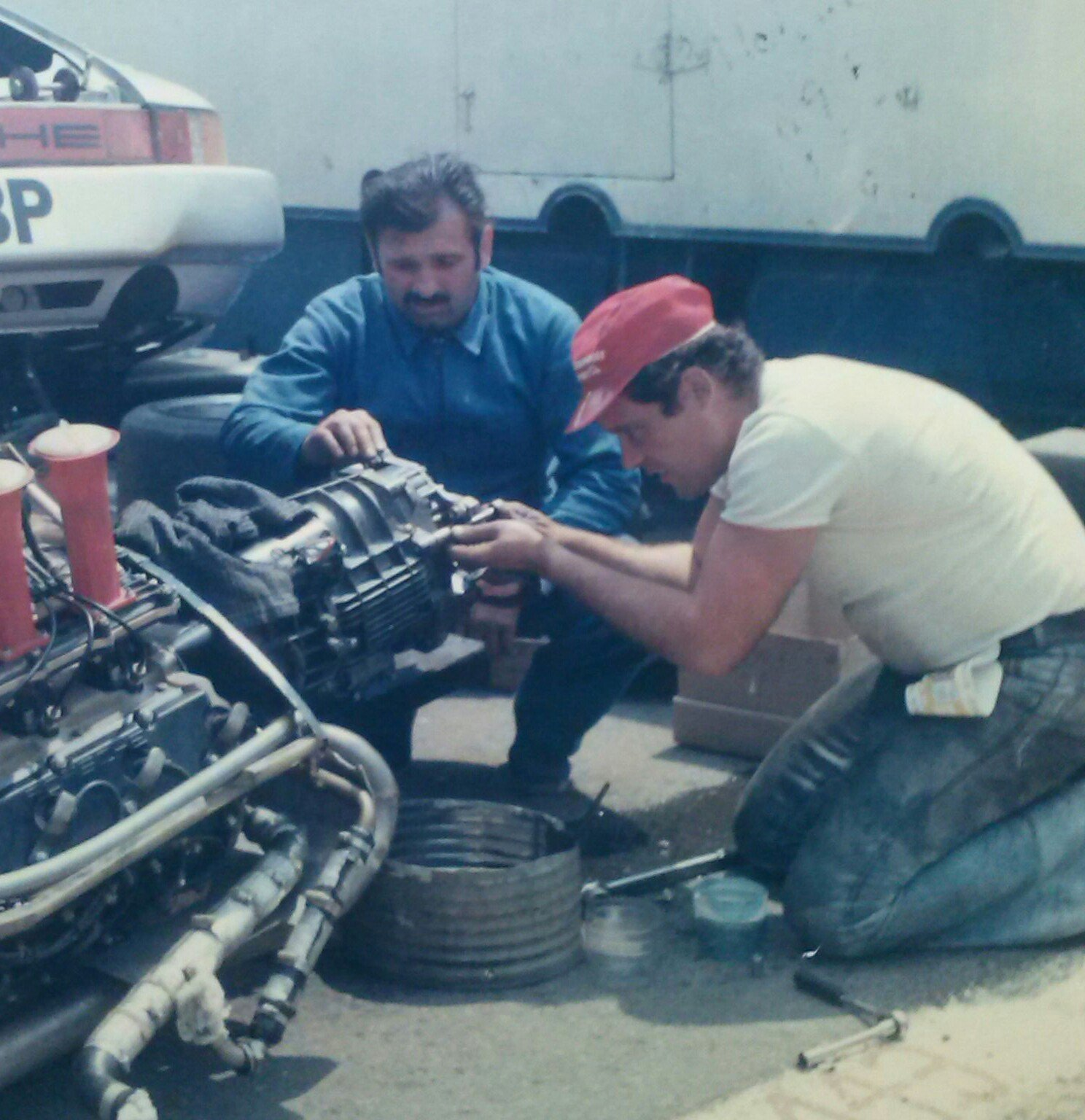
The Louis Meznarie racing team working on Porsche flat-6 motor at 24 Hours of Le Mans 1975; Luc Melua is in the background, his colleague unidentified.

== Early life ==
Meznarie was born in Saintry-sur-Seine (Essonne), France, to migrant parents from Yugoslavia. As a child, he was fond of mechanical games, tinkering with bicycle parts to make them faster. At thirteen, he joined a workshop and got NSU Quickly, a bicycle with an auxiliary engine. From 1945 to 1948 he worked for Sachs motorcycle factory, MR, working with two-stroke engines. From 1948 to 1949 whilst serving in the French Army he remained involved with motorcycles.

In the 1950s, Meznarie began regional motocross races on a NSU Max 250 cm3 OSL.

From 1959 to 1971, Meznarie was an official dealer of NSU for motorcycles and motorcars and engine preparation expert for French races. In 1968, he opened a large workshop in Le Plessis-Chenet (Le Coudray-Montceaux town) with the support of Shell Oil Company. From 1971 to 1983, he was the official engine preparation expert for Porsche, with many victories in 24 Hours of Le Mans, French Rally Championship and European Rally Championship.

== Career ==
"Prepare or sale a car, is not interesting to me if I don’t know who will drive it", Louis Meznarie.

=== NSU official dealer ===
From 1960 to 1963, Meznarie prepared several official Prinz 3 (inline two-cylinders) for the Tour de France, with French driver José Behra.

In 1963, Meznarie prepared one Prinz 4 for Behra who won the Tour de Corse and Monte Carlo Rally in Tourism category.

From 1964 to 1971, Meznarie prepared several official cars (1000, 1200 or 1300 cm3, four-cylinders, 115 hp) for French drivers such as Marie-Claude Beaumont (second of women French Rally Championship, 1966), Guy Chasseuil (second of French Rally Championship, 1966), Bernard Darniche (1st of Rallye du Forez and Rallye du Var in 1969) and Gérard Larrousse (fourth of French Rally Championship, 1966). After an agreement between NSU and the French manufacturer Citroën, he prepared in 1968 a 4-cylinder engine NSU for formula 3 Citroen MEP X7 : 2 cars compete in hill races.

=== Porsche official engine preparation expert ===
In 1971 911 2.4-litre, 260 hp and 2.6-litre, 284 hp for Gérard Larrousse and Jürgen Barth, 9 victories (Autodrome de Linas-Montlhéry, Rouen-Les-Essarts, Magny Cours and others).

In 1972 911 2.4-litres for Jürgen Barth, Sylvain Garant and Mike Kyser at the 24 Hours of Le Mans. They achieved 13th scratch ranking, 1st in category, with only one 911 finishing,

In 1973 a 911 RSR 3-litre with 310 hp (950 kg) for Guy Frequelin (Tour de France and several hill climbs).

In 1974 911 Carrera RSR 3-litres, at 330 hp for Hubert Striebig and Hughes Kirschhoffer (24 Hours of Le Mans) and a 911 RS 3-litre for Thierry Sabine (French Championship, 1st in category 3).

In 1975 and 1976 911 Carrera RSR 3-litres.

In 1976 he prepared 934 turbos at 500 hp for Hubert Striebig and Charlotte Vernet (Albi, Silverstone and 24 Hours of Le Mans).

In 1977 935 turbo for Thierry Sabine.

From 1979 to 1982 911 SC 3-litre (315 to 330 hp) for Bernard Béguin, French Rally Championship 1st in 1979, European Rally Championship 2nd in 1980, scoring two victories in European Rally Championship and one in Belgium Ypres Westhoek Rally in 1981, French Rally Championship 2nd in 1982.

In 1982 and 1983 911 SC 3-litre, 315 hp for Michel Teilhol (French Rally Championship 1st in Division 2).

== Sources ==
- 1972 24 Hours of Le Mans : 13th position for Team Louis Meznarie
- Tour de Corse 1973 : Audi 80 for Guy Fréquelin prepared by Louis Meznarie
- 1974 24 Hours of Le Mans : 44th position for Team Louis Meznarie
- 1975 24 Hours of Le Mans : 28th position for Team Louis Meznarie
- 1976 24 Hours of Le Mans : 11th position for Team Louis Meznarie
- (French) February 2006 Newspaper (1/2): "Louis Meznarie, not so tall, but strong ..."
- (French) February 2006 Newspaper (2/2): "Louis Meznarie, not so tall, but strong...".
