= Jean-Louis Moncet =

Jean-Louis Moncet (born 30 July 1945, in Rabat, Morocco) is a French motorsports journalist.

He is mostly known for his work on Grand Prix racing for French television and magazines.

== Newspapers and magazines career ==
In 1969, he joined the French popular newspaper France Soir for the South of Paris region, where car races were organized on the Autodrome de Linas-Montlhéry.

In 1971, he became chief redactor of motorsport magazine Sport auto, with Gérard Crombac.

In 1973, with a Sport auto team composed of Gérard Crombac, Thierry Lalande and Luc Melua, he built a kitcar in one week-end.

In 1990, he joined Autoplus magazine as sport chief redactor.

== TV career ==
From 1982 to 1990, each week, he was a regular contributor to the AutoMoto program on the French TV station TF1.

From 1990 to 2013, for every Formula One Grand Prix, he served as an analyst, a pre-race interviewer, a pit reporter or a post-race interviewer on the French Formula One broadcasts (on TF1, TV5, and Canal+) with French drivers such as Patrick Tambay, Jacques Laffite and Alain Prost.

Starting in 2014, he served as a pre-race interviewer on Canal+.

== Others ==
In 2008, he opened his Formula One blog.
