= Jean Dussourd =

French civil servant

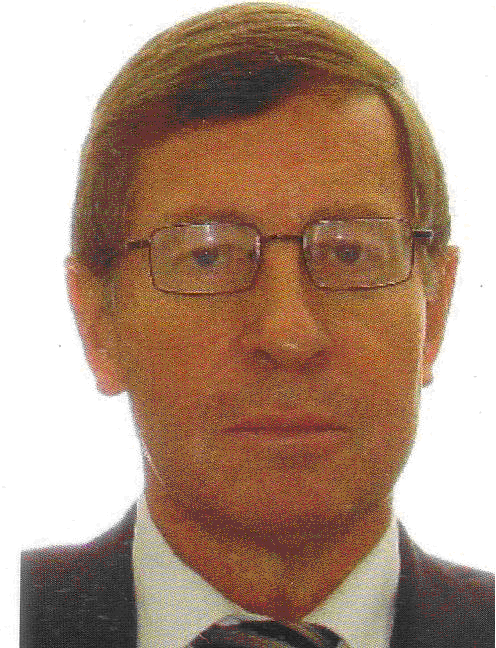
- Jean Dussourd in 2013
- Born: 2 January 1948; Castres, Tarn
- Occupation: French prefect

Jean Dussourd (born 1948) is a French civil servant (prefect).

Jean René Louis Dussourd was born on 2 January 1948 in Castres, Tarn.

He was a student at Lycée Pierre-de-Fermat in Toulouse and lycée Voltaire in Paris.

He is a graduate of Institut d’études politiques de Paris (IEP Paris).

== Career ==
- Élève of the École nationale d’administration or ENA (promotion Guernica : from 1974 to 1976)
- Sub-prefect of Palaiseau in Palaiseau City, from 1990 to 1992
- Prefect of Hautes-Pyrénées in Tarbes from 1993 to 1997
- Prefect of Pas-de-Calais in Arras from 1999 to 2001

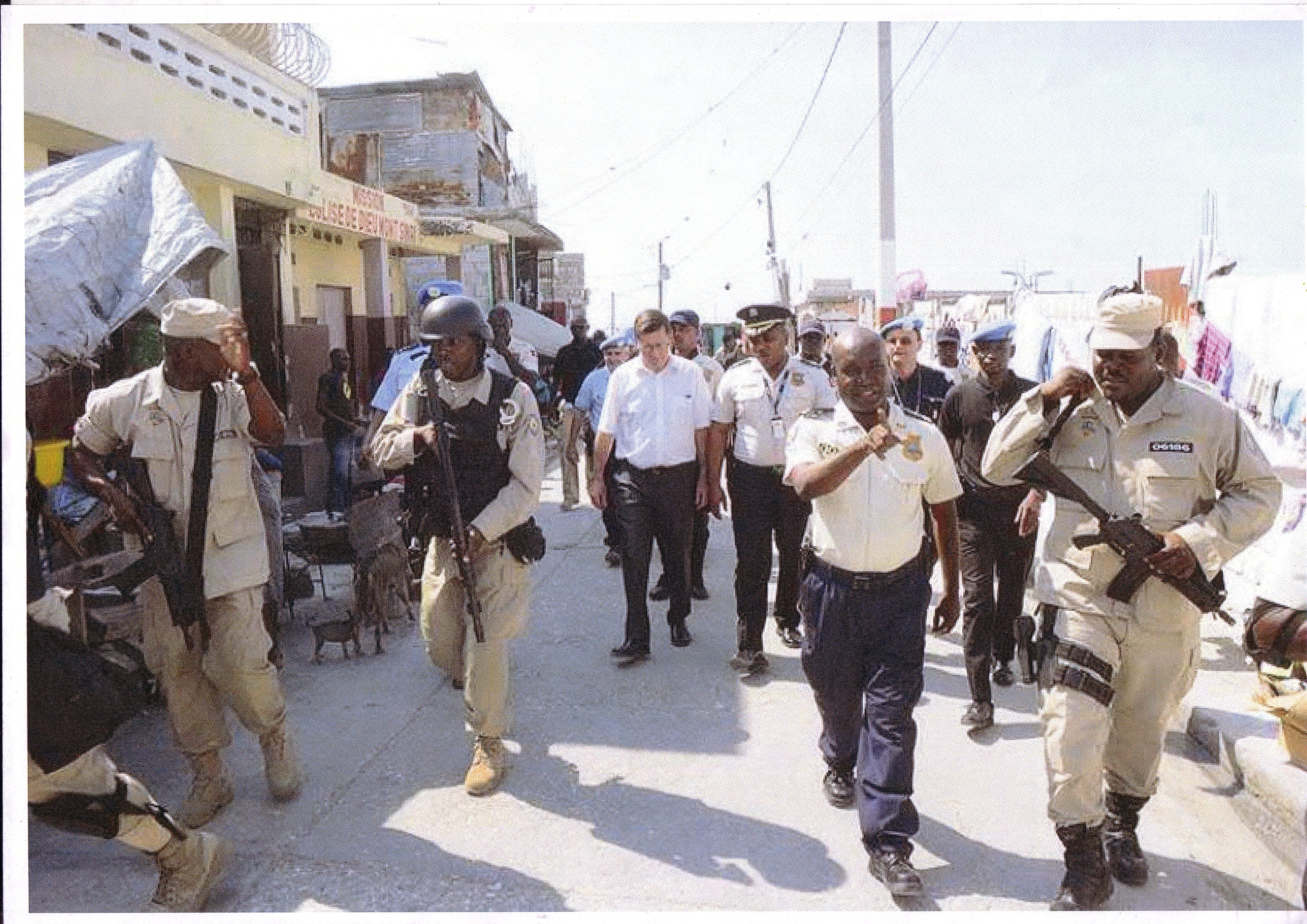
Jean Dussourd in Haiti.

== Honours and awards ==
- France:
  - Chevalier (Knight) of Légion d’honneur

== Sources, Notes, References ==
- (in French) "Dussourd, Jean, René, Louis" (prefect, born 1948), pages 800–801 in Who’s Who in France : Dictionnaire biographique de personnalités françaises vivant en France et à l’étranger, et de personnalités étrangères résidant en France, 44th edition for 2013 edited in 2012, 2371 p., 31 cm, ISBN 978-2-85784-053-4 .
- (in French) http://www.whoswho.fr/bio/jean-dussourd_34476 : Who’s Who in France on line (access restricted : fee)
- http://www.sfhp.fr/index.php?post/2011/12/24/Notice-biographique-Jean-Dussourd
- http://www.ensp.interieur.gouv.fr/Actualites2/Audit-de-la-formation-de-la-police-nationale-d-Haiti
- http://www.un.org/News/fr-press/docs/2005/SGA907.doc.htm
- http://minustah.org/?p=24686
- http://www.diplomatie.gouv.fr/fr/pays-zones-geo/haiti/haiti-deux-ans-plus-tard/aider-au-renforcement-de-l-etat/article/soutien-de-la-france-a-la-police
- http://www.haitilibre.com/article-4416-haiti-politique-fructueux-sejour-du-secretaire-d-etat-aux-collectivites-territoriales-en-france.html
- http://www.unis.unvienna.org/unis/pressrels/2005/sga907.html
- http://www.lagazettedescommunes.com/24371/michel-sappin-remplace-jean-dussourd-a-la-direction-de-la-defense-et-de-la-securite-civiles/
- http://www.lexpress.fr/infos/pers/jean-dussourd.html
- http://www.20minutes.fr/article/13326/Sport-Jean-Dussourd-president-du-comite-d-organisation-des-Mondiaux-d-athletisme.php

Jean Dussourd French Prefect Born: 1948
Political offices
Preceded by François Leonelli	Prefect of Hautes-Pyrénées; 1993 – 1997	Succeeded by Gérard Bougrier
Preceded by Daniel Cadoux	Prefect of Pas-de-Calais; 1999 – 2001	Succeeded by Cyrille Schott
