= 1975 24 Hours of Le Mans =

43rd 24 Hours of Le Mans endurance race

Previous: 1974	Next: 1976
Index: Races | Winners

The 1975 24 Hours of Le Mans was the 43rd Grand Prix of Endurance, and took place on 14 and 15 June 1975.

In the wake of the 1973 oil crisis, the ACO demanded a maximum fuel consumption of 40 liter per 100 km, and with different rules, the 24h was not part of the 1975 World Sportscar Championship. Colloquially called the “Le Mans Economy Run”, stringent refuelling regulations were put in place. Claiming to be unable to match the requisite fuel economy, the Willi Kauhsen Racing Team-entered semi-works Alfa Romeo T33TT12 that dominated the 1975 WSC season remained absent. Matra, three-time winner since 1972, had retired from the sport at the end of 1974, Ferrari had quit already after 1973. Porsche, who had brought a turbo-powered Carrera in 1974, waited until the new WSC rules with two championships came in effect, postponed to 1976. Therefore, in the above 2 liter sportscar category that was favorite for the overall win, this only left Mirage, renamed after sponsor Gulf Oil, and Ligier as front-running works-teams. Both used detuned versions of the 3 liter V8 Cosworth DFV F1 engine which scored its first Le Mans win (the second came in 1980). Two other oil companies, Elf and Esso, supported smaller sportscars with all-female drivers.

The race was won by Jacky Ickx and Derek Bell in their Gulf GR-8, finishing just a lap ahead of the Ligier of Jean-Louis Lafosse and Guy Chasseuil. It was the first victory for an all-British car since the Aston Martin in 1959, and for running at an ‘economic’ speed, the winner covered just one lap less than the winning car of the previous year.

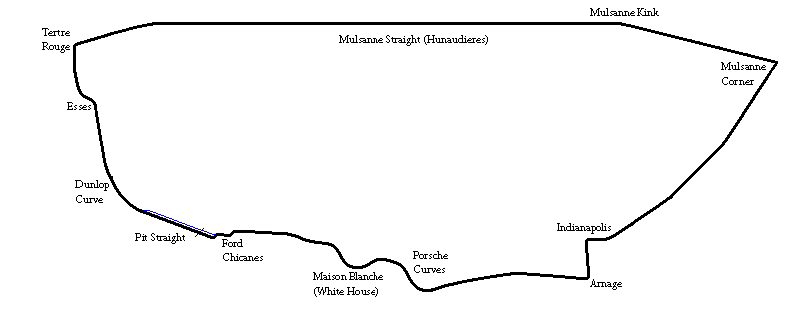
Le Mans in 1975

== Regulations ==
The ongoing fuel-crisis was having a growing impact on international motor-racing, as critics saw the sport as a profligate waste of petrol. The Automobile Club de l'Ouest (ACO), ever wanting to follow its original mandate to advance automobile technology, put in radical measures to provide a solution. All cars had to go 20 laps before refuelling with petrol and oil – roughly equivalent to 270 km (170 mi), around 7mpg, for a 25% improvement. As a reference, the Matras had only done 16 laps between their fuel stops in 1974. Fuel tank sizes were also limited in size.

These, however, put it out of step with the CSI (Commission Sportive Internationale - the FIA’s regulations body) and the FIA therefore removed the Le Mans 24 Hours from the World Championship calendar. This had happened before when the FIA had excluded Le Mans in 1956 because of their stricter safety requirements after the 1955 disaster. It can also be pointed out that Le Mans races prior to 1960 had run to refuelling restrictions. For its part, the CSI had postponed the introduction of its new Group 5 “silhouette” rules until 1976.

The ACO also introduced a new “GTX” (Le Mans Grand Touring Experimental) class for GT cars to use non-homologated equipment like the brand new Porsche 930 turbo. It also opened up its entry list to Group 3 GTs, alongside the Group 5, 4 and 2 cars. Finally, the ACO allowed teams to replace any pieces of equipment during the race, but the defective parts had to be given to the ACO technical team. This year, the ACO also gave a prize to the car which used the smallest amount of fuel. Also the Index of Thermal Efficiency was now opened to all car classes.

Since the race's inception in 1923, the Le Mans circuit had incorporated using public highways. An ambitious plan in the early 1970s had been proposed to build a new Mulsanne Straight parallel to the main road and bypassing the Mulsanne corner. However, by 1975 with the economic recession and reduced interest in motor-racing, no work had been started, and in the end the project was cancelled later in the year.

== Entries ==
To general surprise, the ACO received a commendable 101 applications, which became 71 arriving for qualifying and a final 55 in the race. However, Matra had followed Ferrari out of Sports-Car racing. Alfa Romeo works team Autodelta had sold its cars to German Willi Kauhsen, who chose not to enter, saying there was no way the Alfas could make the necessary fuel economy. Alpine-Renault cited the same reason.

Category	Sports-Prototype Group 5	GT Experimental GTX	Special GT Group 4	Production GT Group 3	Special Touring Group 2	Total Entries
Large-engines >2.0L classes	13 / 11	4 / 1	27 / 22	9 / 7	7 / 5	60 / 46
Medium-engines < 2.0L classes	11 / 9	0	0	0	0	11 / 9

- Note: The first number is the number of arrivals, the second the number who started.

Although John Wyer had semi-retired, he saw an opportunity for his Gulf-Mirage cars with the fuel-formula and the lack of big opposition. Last year the Gulfs had achieved fuel consumption of 6.1mpg. So he and JWA designer John Horsman set about adapting and optimising a new model, the Gulf GR-8 for this single race in the season. It had a long-wheelbase and low-drag body. They detuned the Cosworth DFV to run at a 8400rpm rev-limit, down about 2000rpm. The engine would now put out 380 bhp capable of 310 kp/h (195 mph). Chemists at Gulf Oil developed a fuel for the cars and put together they could achieve an impressive 7.25mpg. Once again, Wyer was able to call upon Jacky Ickx to drive, partnered with Derek Bell, while the other car had Vern Schuppan and Jean-Pierre Jaussaud.

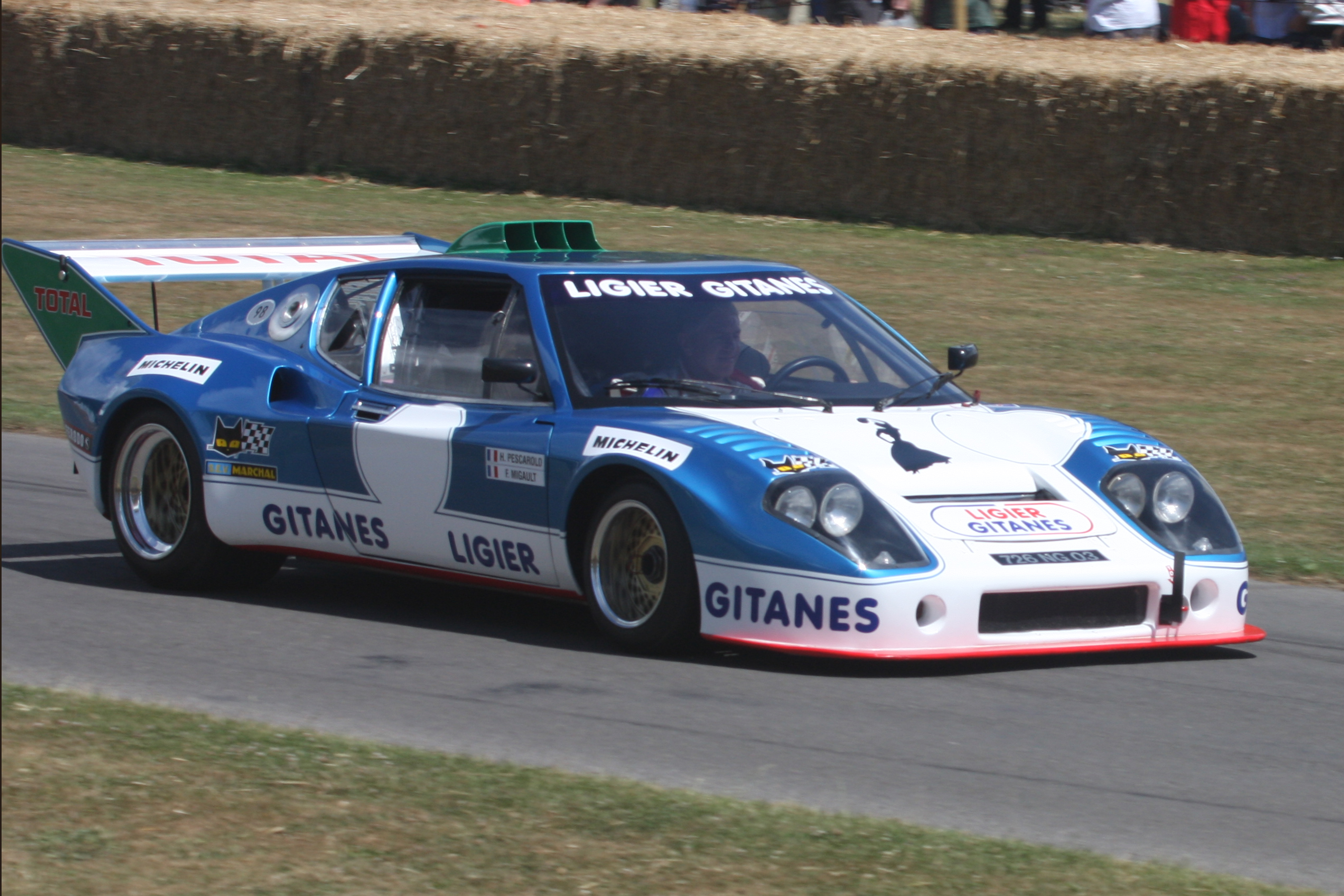
Ligier JS2

In the absence of other manufacturers, it was Guy Ligier who would be Gulf's biggest competition. Suffering from the effects of the economic downturn, Ligier realised he would not have sufficient cars built to get Group 4 homologation. Having purchased the facilities of the defunct Matra Sport at the end of 1974, Ligier was preparing to enter Formula One. With the services of Matra's engineer Gérard Ducarouge and ace driver Henri Pescarolo he also adapted his JS2 cars to carry the Cosworth DFV engine (detuned to about 410 bhp) and Hewland gearboxes. However, being about 10% heavier than the Gulfs meant the Ligiers were slightly slower in a straight line. For the race, regular drivers François Migault and Jean-Louis Lafosse were split: Migault drove with Pescarolo, while Lafosse teamed up with Ligier-regular Guy Chasseuil. As a late entry, the team also ran a 320 bhp Maserati-engined version for two other former Matra drivers, Jean-Pierre Beltoise and Jean-Pierre Jarier.

Meanwhile, in the World Championship, it had been the five-year old, 360 bhp Porsche 908/03 of Joest Racing taking the battle to Willi Kauhsen's Alfa Romeos. Norbert Singer, Porsche works engineer, was seconded to the team and gave the car a longtail chassis. Team-owner Reinhold Joest drove with Mario Casoni and Jürgen Barth. British privateer Alain de Cadenet arrived with a new car – a Lola T380 fitted with a Cosworth DFV capable of 400 bhp by engine-specialist John Nicholson. Despite this the chassis was very new, and nearly 40 kp/h slower on the straights than the Gulfs and Ligiers. It was driven by regular racing duo of de Cadenet with Chris Craft. Swiss privateer Heinz Schulthess likewise entered a new Lola-Cosworth T284, tuned by another engine-specialist, compatriot Heini Mader. Shin Kato returned with his latest Sigma model, the MC-75, that was now powered by a 1.6-litre Toyota turbo engine which put it in the 3-litre class because of the x1.4 equivalency factor for turbo engines (in sports car racing, the factor in Formula 1 was x2.0).

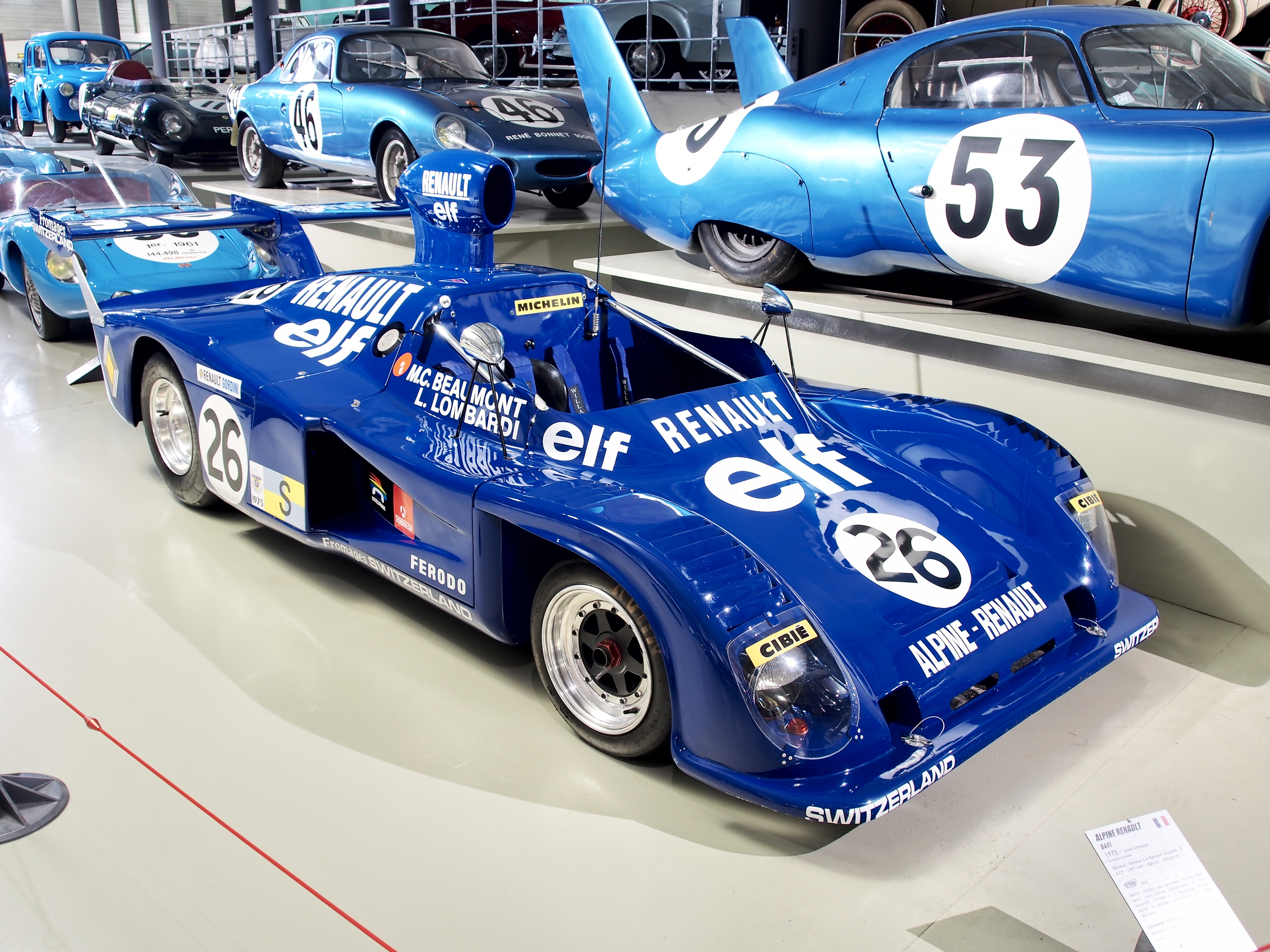
Elf-sponsored Alpine Renault A441 of Beaumont & Lombardi

The fuel-economy regulations now made S-2000 class a lot more competitive. Renault Sport had won the inaugural 1973 World Rally Championship, and was now focused on Sports-car racing. Along with its subsidiary companies Gordini (engines) and Alpine (chassis) had been working on a new sports car. For 1975, the new turbo-powered A442 made an immediate impression beating the Alfa Romeos at Mugello. However their cars were very new and proved fast but unreliable. The works team did not enter, however a non-turbo, A441 arrived in the colours of Elf Switzerland for the all-female team of Marie-Claude Beaumont and Lella Lombardi. It was the first Alpine to race at Le mans for six years. André Moynet, French war hero, politician and amateur racer, had been building his own sports car, based on a Chappe et Gesselin chassis with a 2-litre Simca-JRD engine and Porsche transmission. He gained sponsorship from Elf's competitor Esso-France, who suggested also compiling an all-female driving team. Moynet hired Michèle Mouton, Christine Dacremont and Marianne Hoepfner for his car.

The strong showing by the new 2-litre Simca-ROC engines in the 1974 race saw five cars with Fred Stadler's engine including three Lolas of his own team.

In lieu of the works team, Ferrari was represented primarily by the North American Racing Team (NART) bringing four different cars in three categories. The 308 special returned in Group 5, and a regular 365 GTB/4 for Ronnie Bucknum/Carlo Facetti in Group 4. The other two were entered in the new GTX category: a new 365 Berlinetta Boxer and a 365 Daytona spyder.

The Group 4 Special GT class was dominated by the Porsche RSR teams. This year's most successful team - Georg Loos’ Gelo Racing - had three cars entered, for John Fitzpatrick (the current European GT champion)/Gijs van Lennep, Tim Schenken / Howden Ganley and Toine Hezemans/Manfred Schurti. Their main competition came from their compatriot Kremer Racing and Tebernum teams (supported by Joest Racing), the Swiss Porsche Club Romand, Spanish Escuderia Montjuïch along with the local French ASA Cachia-Bondy team and owner-engineers Robert Buchet and Louis Meznarie.

Up against the armada of 911s (comprising half the field with 28 of 55 starters) alongside the NART Ferrari, were two other 365s for the Ecurie Francorchamps and French privateer Marcel Mignot. Along with Henri Greder's Chevrolet Corvette was also a De Tomaso Pantera and a Datsun 240Z. As expected, Porsche dominated the new Group 3 entry with eight of the nine cars against Wicky Racing's lone De Tomaso Pantera.

There was renewed interest in Group 2 this year, with seven cars arriving for qualification. These included two Ford Capris from the French Shark Team and the return of Claude Buchet's Mazda twin-rotary RX-3. Against them were three BMWs: defending class-winner Jean-Claude Aubriet brought his 3.0 CSL back. Lichtenstein engine-specialist Max Heidegger prepared a BMW 2002 TI with a F2 engine (capable of 260 bhp) for French privateer Daniel Brillat. The third was another French privateer. Hervé Poulain, an art dealer and keen racer, entered another 3.0 CSL and convinced his friend, artist Alexander Calder, to paint it. Although not the first “art car” (Porsche had raced the psychedelic Martini-917 in 1970 and “Pink Pig” in 1971), it was to become the first of many BMW Art Cars. BMW insured it for DM 1 million (~US$430 000), and Poulain got 1964-winner Jean Guichet and American IMSA-BMW driver Sam Posey as co-drivers. The last entry was a big American “muscle car” – a Plymouth Barracuda with a big 426cu in Hemi engine entered by French privateer Michel Guicherd.

== Practice ==
The ACO cancelled the March Test Weekend, when the CSI scheduled a championship race at Mugello on the same weekend. Thus, many teams came to Race Week with no real idea of their racing fuel economy. The ACO required every car to prove some time during the practice sessions that it could run at least 20 laps at a race pace before refuelling. This meant at least one 60-90 minute run. But in compensation, the total practice time was increased to ten hours over the Wednesday and Thursday. Also, every driver now had to pass a minimum lap-time in both daylight and night.

Jacky Ickx immediately set the pace on Wednesday night with a 3:49.9 lap that would put his Gulf on pole. This was fully fourteen seconds slower than the Matra's pole time the previous year. After initial issues, on Thursday Jean-Pierre Jaussaud put the sister Gulf on the front row with a 3:51.8. Third was Lafosse in the Ligier with Casoni fourth in the Joest-Porsche and Pescarolo in the other Ligier. Then came the two Lolas of Schulthess and De Cadenet, joined by 2-litre Lola-ROC (4:02.8) fractionally ahead of the women in the Alpine. Tenth on the grid was the Ligier-Maserati of Beltoise/Jarier. Eleventh was the BMW “art-car” (4:06.0) proving significantly faster than the Group 4 GTs, the quickest of which was the Buchet Porsche in 13th (4:16.0) ahead of the Tebernum Porsche. The Buchet Porsche's stablemate, of Wollek/Grandet, was the first of the Group 3 cars down in 38th with a 4:28.9. Slowest qualifier was the little BMW 2002 with a 4:47.9, although it was still quicker in its class than a Ford Capri and the ‘Hemicuda’

A major argument broke out on Friday when the officials declared that the NART Dino 308 GT4 had not qualified, although it had met the qualification requirements. Team manager Luigi Chinetti was incensed and when his appeal was denied he pulled all four of his Ferraris off the dummy grid in protest, as the cars were forming up on Saturday. Some last minute calls and preparation got the Japanese Sigma and the Claude Buchet Mazda RX-3 there in their stead. Paul Rilly, running the Lamborghini Islero that had not qualified in the GTX category was not at home and missed his call to bring the car back to the track.

The Ecuador-Marlboro team had brought two cars, neither of which qualified. However, in a race-first, the team still managed to sneak onto the back row of the dummy grid with its 911, and even got to run three laps in the race until it was spotted and black-flagged by the officials.

== Race ==
=== Start ===
On a hot Saturday afternoon, Bell took the lead from the rolling start. Schuppan then overtook him heading onto the Mulsanne Straight for the first time and proceeded to build a lead. Joest slotted into third with Craft then Pescarolo, in the first of the Ligiers, and the Group 2 BMW “art-car” in a credible sixth. As always there were a number of cars pitting with early problems: The Schulthess Lola had not been able to fire up in time and started the race a lap behind after the rolling start had passed by. Lafosse brought his Ligier in when a warning light came on, and lost a lap only to find that it was the light at fault. The BMW art-car pitted with a broken brake-line, dropping it well down the order, and two of the ROC-Lolas pitted with the start of many electrical issues.

The Gulfs were able to maintain a strong 4-minute pace right through to their first pit-stops after 21 laps, and soon afterward Ickx took the lead the car was never going to forfeit thereafter. It was at the first stops that the only victim was afflicted by the fuel regulations. Marie-Claude Beaumont, in the Alpine 2-litre running sixth, came to a stop at Mulsanne corner with no fuel three laps before her scheduled refuelling stop. The team had managed 26 laps on a tank during practice. Able to manually pump some fuel she could only get as far as Indianapolis. A faulty fuel system was blamed, but team principal Gérard Larrousse later admitted the team had got their fuel calculations wrong.

Going into the third hour, the Gulfs were 2 seconds apart, with de Cadenet, Joest and Casoni now the last on the lead lap. Migault was a lap down and the other two Ligiers a further lap back with Posey in the BMW catching up again and the Poirot Porsche in eighth. Schickentanz in the Tebernum Porsche lead the GTs by ten seconds from the Fitzpatrick Gelo-Porsche. Beltoise in the Ligier-Maserati was running sixth when he tried to outbrake a Ferrari going into Indianapolis, but only ended up getting pushed off into the Armco barrier. Craft pitted the de Cadenet from third. The notorious vibration of the Cosworth engine had popped rivets in the engine case and broken the exhaust. The repairs took 45 minutes, and when Craft came back out he set the fastest lap rushing back through the field. The third Gelo Porsche (Hezemans/Schurti) crashed when its suspension failed. They continued on until nightfall when the car was retired and the drivers were transferred to the team's leading car, now running fifth.

=== Night ===
Around 9.30pm, as night fell, the second-placed Gulf of Schuppan/Jaussaud spent 25 minutes in the pits replacing an alternator, dropping it to 5th, six laps behind the teammates The BMW ‘art-car’ had got back up to 6th when a broken CV joint left Posey stuck out on the circuit. In the GTs it was Fitzpatrick two laps ahead of the “Beurlys” car with the Kremer car closing.

Just before midnight Alain De Cadenet, running third, was completely unaware when the engine-cover of his Lola flew off while at speed on the Mulsanne Straight. It landed on the track and fourth-placed François Migault had the misfortune to hit it at full speed in the dark with his Ligier. Although repaired (taking three-quarters an hour) a faulty alternator in the small hours dropped them out of contention.

Around 2am the second-placed Joest Porsche collided with Poirot's 908 (running 6th) at Mulsanne corner. Repairs took 20 minutes and dropped them down to fourth. By half-time, the Gulf cars were back running 1-2 (albeit 6 laps apart), ahead of the Lafosse/Chasseuil Ligier and the repaired Joest Porsche. The Gelo Porsche still led the GT class, and running fifth overall, now ahead of the Kremer Porsche up to second in class.

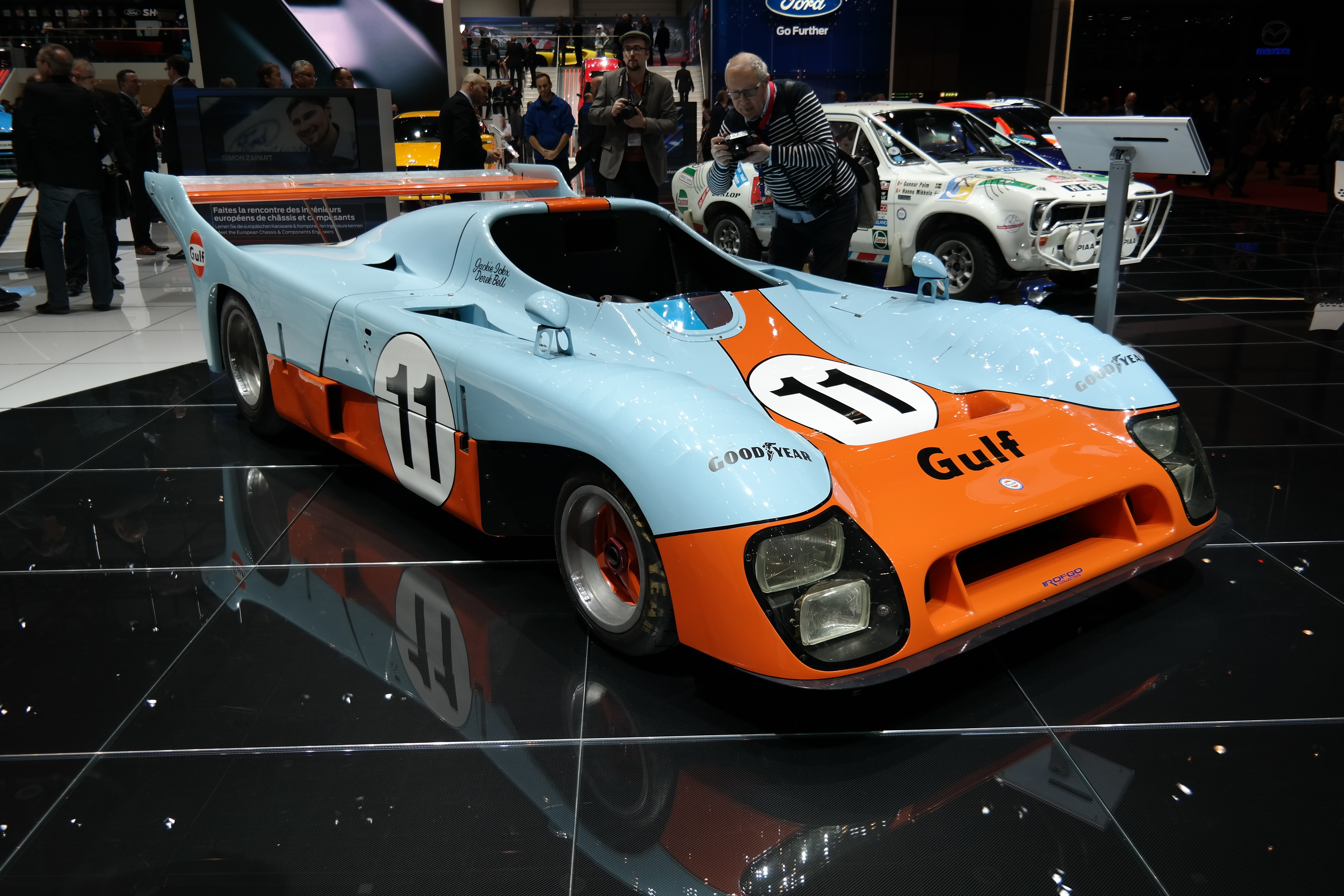
Gulf-Mirage GR8 of Ickx & Bell

=== Morning ===
Soon after dawn Pescarolo suffered a puncture on his Ligier, ruining the bodywork, and stranding him out on the track. About the same time a very similar accident happened to Joest but he was more fortunate to be able to get the Porsche back to the pits. However the repairs put the car 15 laps behind the leader and only two ahead of the Gelo Porsche.

By the time the sun was up, Ickx and Bell had built up a sizeable lead. Right on 6am Jaussaud pitted complaining of an excessive rear-end vibration. Subsequent checks and work took a quarter-hour and put them on the same lap, two minutes behind the Ligier. Joest had yet another puncture at 8am, but kept his place. The Gelo Porsche was now four laps back, still holding a two-lap lead over the Kremer and “Beurlys” cars. Throughout the morning the Ligier traded places with the second Gulf which would power past only to then come into the pits to investigate its engine vibration further.

Soon after midday the rain arrived. The Gulf of Schuppan/Jaussaud pitted yet again, when water got into its electrics. Drying them out cost fifteen minutes which finally gave the Ligier breathing space in second place.

=== Finish and post-race ===
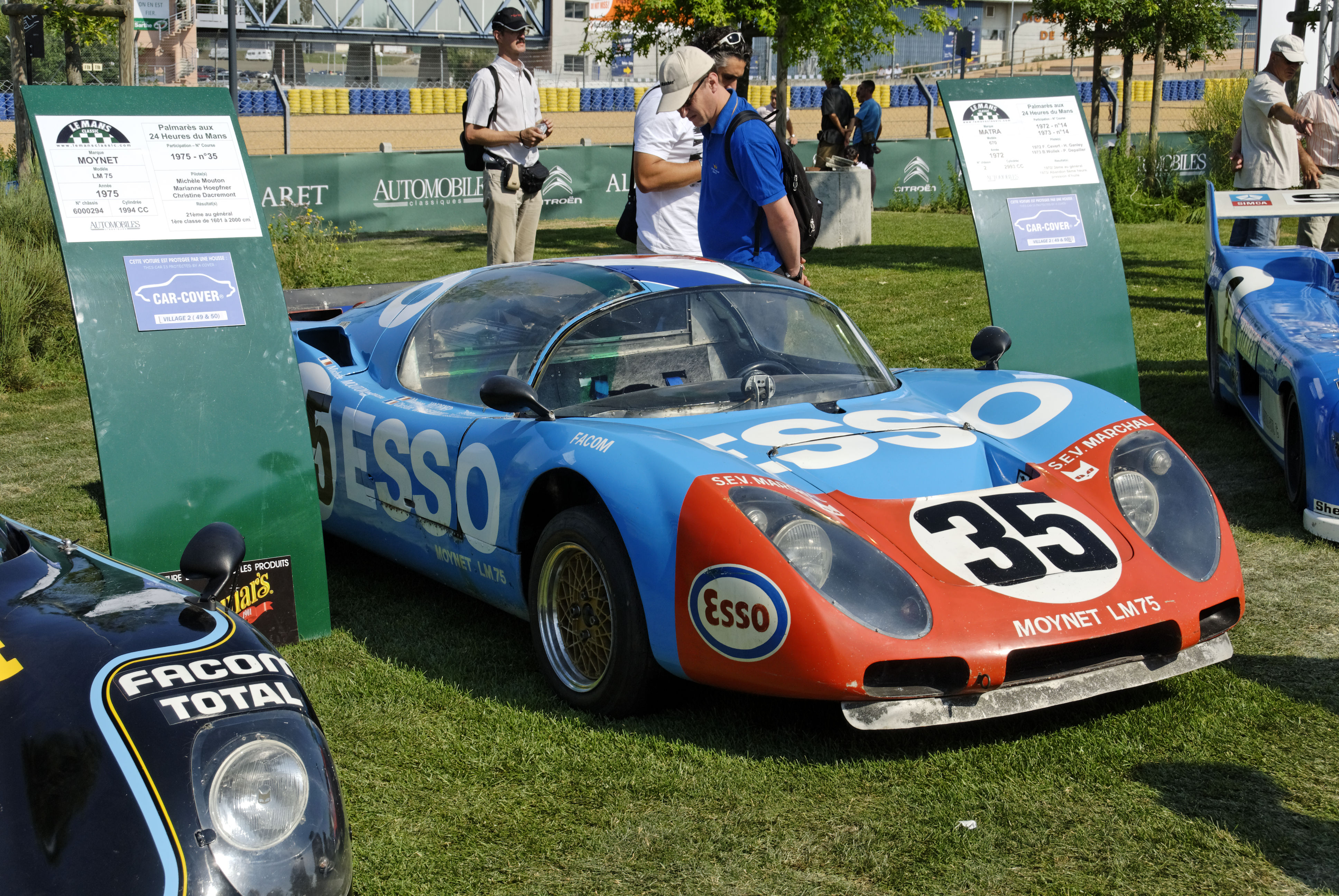
Two-litre class-winning Moynet LM 75 of Mouton, Hoepfner and Dacremont

The leading Gulf also had the same ongoing vibration as their stablemate and it finally came to a head when it was forced to pit at 2.30pm with an exhaust shaken apart by the vibration. While repairs were being done, the Ligier closed in. It had just got onto the lead lap when Bell took the Gulf back out, fuelled to the finish. When the Ligier subsequently pitted for its final fuel stop, the race was secure for JWA. About the same time, the Kremer Porsche had to pit with a major engine failure. Amazingly, the team was able to replace the whole engine in 30 minutes and they only lost ten laps to finish 9th.

Going into the final hour Bob Wollek, running 12th, spun his Porsche damaging the exhaust. While pitted, the crew mistakenly refuelled the car, before its requisite 20 laps and was disqualified. The fastest S-2000, the Lola-ROC of Ferrier/Lapeyre/Ethuin had issues from the start but was stopped at its final pitstop when the starter motor broke.

In the end Ickx and Bell won by a lap from the Lafosse/Chasseuil Ligier. Schuppan/Jaussaud were third, five laps back, with Joest's Porsche 908 another five laps back. The next eight places were Porsche GTs lead home by the Gelo car of van Lennep/Fitzpatrick/Hezemans winning Group 4 by four laps from the veteran Jean Blaton's privateer entry with Belgian racing-journalist Nick Faure.

De Cadenet's Lola was 14th, finishing the race with a bodywork stuck together with a lot of adhesive tape. First of the S-2000 class home was the Moynet with the all-female crew, finishing 21st, after a careful and trouble-free run. The last classified finisher, and winner of the Group 2 category by attrition, was the little BMW 2002 having spent the first half of the race battling with the Mazda RX-3 for last place.

Winner of the Index of Thermal Efficiency was the second X-Racing Group 3 Porsche. The privateer Lola-ROC (although slowest of the S-2000 class) came second in class four laps behind the Moynet, and comfortably used the smallest amount of fuel. It was the first Le Mans victory for the nine-year old Cosworth-DFV engine finally proving its reliability. This was the fourth win for John Wyer, dating back to the Aston Martin triumph in 1959 and the second for Jacky Ickx. After the race, Wyer retired for good and the JWA team was disbanded.

After an impressive start, the BMW “art car” had been retired with a damaged driveshaft in the sixth hour. Having been displayed in the Louvre and in Munich before the race, afterward it went onto the Museum of Modern Art in New York. As it was, Ickx and Bell covered only one lap less than the winning Matra of the previous year. With the cars run at far lower engines revs, the mechanical wear was far lower and thirty cars were running at the end – equalling the record of 1923 and 1951. Ironically that meant there was much more fuel consumed overall than in the previous year's race. Although derided at the time, the ACO regulations would, in fact, be a predecessor to the Group C era of the 1980s.

== Official results ==
=== Finishers ===
Results taken from Quentin Spurring's book, officially licensed by the ACO Class Winners are in Bold text.

Pos	Class	No.	Team	Drivers	Chassis	Engine	Tyre	Laps
1	**S** **3.0**	**11**	(United Kingdom) **Gulf Research Racing**	**(Belgium) Jacky Ickx** **(United Kingdom) Derek Bell**	Gulf-Mirage GR8	Cosworth DFV 3.0L V8	G	337
2	S 3.0	5	(France) Automobiles Ligier Gitanes	(France) Jean-Louis Lafosse (France) Guy Chasseuil	Ligier JS2	Cosworth DFV 3.0L V8	MI	336
3	S 3.0	10	(United Kingdom) Gulf Research Racing	(Australia) Vern Schuppan (France) Jean-Pierre Jaussaud	Gulf-Mirage GR8	Cosworth DFV 3.0L V8	G	331
4	S 3.0	15	(Germany) Joest Racing	(Germany) Reinhold Joest (Italy) Mario Casoni (Germany) Jürgen Barth	Porsche 908/03	Porsche 3.0L F8	G	326
5	**GTS**	**58**	**(Germany) Gelo Racing Team**	**(Netherlands) Gijs van Lennep** **(United Kingdom) John Fitzpatrick** **(Liechtenstein) Manfred Schurti** **(Netherlands) Toine Hezemans**	Porsche 911 Carrera RSR	Porsche 3.0L F6	G	316
6	GTS	69	(Belgium) "Beurlys" (private entrant)	(Belgium) “Beurlys” (Jean Blaton) (United Kingdom) Nick Faure (United Kingdom) John Cooper	Porsche 911 Carrera RSR	Porsche 3.0L F6	D	312
7	GTS	53	(France) ASA Cachia-Bondy	(France) Henri Cachia (France) Jacques Borras (France) Pascal Moisson	Porsche 911 Carrera RSR	Porsche 3.0L F6	D	310
8	GTS	55	(France) Écurie Robert Buchet	(France) Claude Ballot-Léna (Canada) Jacques Bienvenue	Porsche 911 Carrera RSR	Porsche 3.0L F6	D	305
9	GTS	65	(Germany) Porsche Kremer Racing Team	(Mexico) Juan Carlos Bolaños (Mexico) Andres Contreras (Mexico) Billy Sprowls	Porsche 911 Carrera RSR	Porsche 3.0L F6	D	305
10	**GT**	**84**	**(Switzerland) G. Maurer** (private entrant)	**(Switzerland) Gerhard Maurer** **(Switzerland) Christian Baez** **(Switzerland) Eugen Strähl**	Porsche 911 Carrera RS	Porsche 3.0L F6	D	296
11	GT	67	(France) A.-C. Verney (private entrant)	(France) Anne-Charlotte Verney (Belgium) Yvette Fontaine (France) Corinne Tarnaud	Porsche 911 Carrera RS	Porsche 3.0L F6	D	295
12	GTS	47	(Belgium) Ecurie Francorchamps	(France) Jean-Claude Andruet (Belgium) Teddy Pilette (Belgium) Baron Hughes de Fierlandt	Ferrari 365 GTB/4	Ferrari 4.4L V12	MI	294
13	GTS	48	(France) M. Mignot (private entrant)	(France) Marcel Mignot (France) Philippe Gurdjian (United States) Harry Jones	Ferrari 365 GTB/4	Ferrari 4.4L V12	MI	294
14	S 3.0	4	(United Kingdom) A. de Cadenet (private entrant)	(United Kingdom) Alain de Cadenet (United Kingdom) Chris Craft	Lola T380 LM	Cosworth DFV 3.0L V8	G	292
15	**GTX**	**20**	**(Switzerland) Porsche Club Romand**	**(Switzerland) Claude Haldi** **(France) Bernard Béguin** **(Switzerland) Peter Zbinden**	Porsche 911 Carrera; RSR Turbo	Porsche 2.2L F6 Turbo	MI	291
16	GTS	43	(Belgium) Team Claude Dubois (private entrant); Ecuador Marlboro Team	(Switzerland) Pierre Rubens (Italy) Paolo Bozzetto	De Tomaso Pantera	Ford 5.8L V8	MI	291
17	GT	77	(France) P. Dagoreau (private entrant)	(France) Philippe Dagoreau (France) Thierry Sabine (Switzerland) Jean-Pierre Aeschlimann	Porsche 911 Carrera RS	Porsche 3.0L F6	MI	285
18	GT	80	(France) X Racing	(France) Raymond Touroul (France) Philippe Hesnault	Porsche 911 Carrera RS	Porsche 3.0L F6	D	284
19	GT	63	(Switzerland) Porsche Club Romand	(Switzerland) Jean-Claude Bering (Germany) Klaus Utz (Germany) Horst Godel	Porsche 911 Carrera RS	Porsche 3.0L F6	D	284
20	GT	87	(France) X Racing	(France) Philippe Demagne (France) René Boubet	Porsche 911 Carrera S	Porsche 2.7L F6	D	282
21	**S** **2.0**	**35**	**(France) Société Esso** (private entrant)	**(France) Michèle Mouton** **(France) Marianne Hoepfner** **(France) Christine Dacremont**	Moynet LM75	Simca-JRD 1994cc S4	MI	270
22	S 2.0	30	(France) J.-M. Lemerle (private entrant)	(France) Jean-Marie Lemerle (France) Patrick Daire (France) Alain Levié	Lola T292	Simca-ROC 1994cc S4	G	266
23	GTS	61	(France) Écurie Armagnac Bogorre (private entrant)	(France) Christian Bussi (France) Patrick Metral	Porsche 911 Carrera RSR	Porsche 3.0L F6	D	266
24	S 2.0	28	(France) Société Racing Organisation; Course	(France) François Sérvanin (France) Jacques Henry (France) Albert Dufrène	Lola T294	Simca-ROC 1994cc S4	G	258
25	GTS	71	(France) J. Laplacette (private entrant)	(France) Joël Laplacette (France) Alain Leroux (France) Claude Pigeon	Porsche 911 Carrera RSR	Porsche 3.0L F6	MI	258
26	GTS	72	(France) A. Haller (private entrant)	(France) André Haller (Germany) Hans Schuller (France) Benoit Maechler	Datsun 240Z	Datsun 2.4L S6	B	254
27	**TS**	**91**	**(Germany) Heidegger Racing Team**	**(France) Daniel Brillat** **(Italy) Giancarlo Gagliardi** **(Switzerland) Michel Degoumois**	BMW 2002Ti	BMW 1990cc S4	KL	252
N/C*	GTS	50	(France) L. Meznarie (private entrant)	(France) Hübert Striebig (France) Hugues Kirschoffer (France) Pierre Mauroy	Porsche 911 Carrera RSR	Porsche 3.0L F6	D	243
N/C*	S 2.0	38	(United Kingdom) Rays Racing	(United Kingdom) Nigel Clarkson (United Kingdom) Derek Worthington	Lola T292/294	Cosworth BDA 1950cc S4	G	241
N/C*	S 2.0	23	(United Kingdom) Madison Racing Team	(United Kingdom) Richard Knight (United Kingdom) Mike Knight (France) “Cyprien” (Christian Mons]	March 75S	Cosworth BDG 1975cc S4	G	218

- Note *: Not Classified because did not cover sufficient distance (70% of the leader) at the 12, 18 and 24-hour intervals.

=== Did Not Finish ===
Pos	Class	No	Team	Drivers	Chassis	Engine	Tyre	Laps	Reason
DSQ	GT	78	(France) Écurie Buchet (France) C. Grandet (private entrant)	(France) Cyril Grandet (France) Bob Wollek	Porsche 911 Carrera RSR	Porsche 3.0L F6	MI	294	Premature refuel (24hr)
DNF	S 3.0	3	(France) C. Poirot (private entrant)	(France) Christian Poirot (France) Gérard Cuynet (Ecuador) Guillermo Ortega	Porsche 908/02	Porsche 3.0L F8	D	249	Transmission (21hr)
DNF	S 2.0	27	(France) Société Racing Organisation; Course	(France) Xavier Lapeyre (France) Christian Ethuin (France) Laurent Ferrier	Lola T294	Simca-ROC 1994cc S4	G	223	Starter motor (24hr)
DNF	S 2.0	29	(France) Société Racing Organisation; Course	(France) Pierre-Marie Painvin (France) Franz Hummel	Lola T292	Simca-ROC 1994cc S4	G	206	Transmission (23hr)
DNF	S 3.0	1	(Switzerland) Wicky Racing Team	(Morocco) Max Cohen-Olivar (Switzerland) Philippe Coran (France) Joël Brachet	Porsche 908/02K	Porsche 3.0L F8	G	161	Transmission (17hr)
DNF	S 3.0	6	(France) Automobiles Ligier Gitanes	(France) Henri Pescarolo (France) François Migault	Ligier JS2	Cosworth DFV 3.0L V8	MI	146	Puncture (14hr)
DNF	GTS	59	(Germany) Gelo Racing Team	(Australia) Tim Schenken (New Zealand) Howden Ganley	Porsche 911 Carrera RSR	Porsche 3.0L F6	G	106	Gearbox (21hr)
DNF	GTS	52	(France) Écurie du Nord	(Switzerland) William Vollery (France) Roger Dorchy (Switzerland) Eric Chapuis	Porsche 911 Carrera RSR	Porsche 3.0L F6	D	93	Engine (13hr)
DNF	GTS	68	(France) G. Verrier (private entrant)	(France) Guy Verrier (Switzerland) Florian Vetsch (Switzerland) Jean-Robert Corthay	Porsche 911 Carrera RS	Porsche 3.0L F6	MI	91	Engine (10hr)
DNF	TS	98	(France) Auto Mazda Claude Buchet	(France) Claude Buchet (France) Jean Rondeau	Mazda RX-3 Coupé	Mazda 12A 2-Rotor (2.3L equiv.)	D	78	Engine (13hr)
DNF	TS	93	(France) H. Poulain (private entrant)	(France) Hervé Poulain (United States) Sam Posey (France) Jean Guichet	BMW 3.0 CSL	BMW 3.5L S6	D	73	Transmission (9hr)
DNF	GTS	96	(France) J. Bonnemaison (private entrant)	(France) Lucien Nageotte (France) Gérard Picard	Porsche 911 Carrera RS	Porsche 3.0L F6	D	48	Electrics (5hr)
DNF	GTS	16	(Germany) Joest Racing (Germany) Tebernum Racing	(Germany) Clemens Schickentanz (Germany) Hartwig Bertrams	Porsche 911 Carrera RSR	Porsche 3.0L F6	D	42	Engine (5hr)
DNF	GTS	60	(Germany) Gelo Racing Team	(Netherlands) Toine Hezemans (Liechtenstein) Manfred Schurti	Porsche 911 Carrera RSR	Porsche 3.0L F6	G	41	Accident (10hr)
DNF	S 3.0	18	(Japan) Sigma Automotive	(Japan) Hiroshi Fushida (Japan) Harukuni Takahashi	Sigma MC75	Toyota 1636cc S4 Turbo	D	37	Oil pump (7hr)
DNF	S 3.0	97	(France) Automobiles Ligier Gitanes	(France) Jean-Pierre Beltoise (France) Jean-Pierre Jarier	Ligier JS2	Maserati 3.0L V6	MI	36	Accident (4hr)
DNF	TS	95	(France) Shark Team	(France) Jean-Claude Guérie (France) Dominique Fornage	Ford Capri LV	Ford 3.0L V6	D	27	Engine (4hr)
DNF	GTS	7	(Belgium) Beurlys International; Auto (private entrant)	(France) Pietro Polese (Italy) "Willer" (Germano Premol)	De Tomaso Pantera	Ford 5.8L V8	MI	22	Engine (9hr)
DNF	S 2.0	26	Equipe Elf Switzerland	(France) Marie-Claude Beaumont (Italy) Lella Lombardi	Renault-Alpine A441C	Renault 1997cc V6	MI	20	Fuel pump (8hr)
DNF	GTS	57	(Germany) Ganto Racing	(United States) John Rulon-Miller (United States) Tom Waugh (United Kingdom) Serge Godard	Porsche 911 Carrera RSR	Porsche 3.0L F6	D	16	Oil leak (10hr)
DNF	S 3.0	12	(Switzerland) Racing Team Schulthess (private entrant)	(Switzerland) Heinz Schulthess (France) Hervé Bayard (Switzerland) André Savary	Lola T284	Cosworth DFV 3.0L V8	G	16	Chassis (3hr)
DNF	S 2.0	40	(France) P. Mettetal (private entrant)	(France) Jean Ragnotti (France) Michel Lateste	Tecma 755	Ford-Hart 1790cc S4	MI	11	Fuel injection (2hr)
DNF	GT	83	(France) J.-Y. Gadal (private entrant)	(France) Jean-Yves Gadal (France) "Ségolen" (André Gahinet)	Porsche 911 Carrera RS	Porsche 2.7L F6	MI	6	Electrics (3hr)
DNF	TS	90	(France) J.-C. Aubriet (private entrant)	(France) Jean-Claude Aubriet (France) "Dépnic" (Jean-Claude Depince)	BMW 3.0 CSL	BMW 3.5L S6	D	1	Accident (3hr)
DNF	GTS	42	(France) H. Greder (private entrant)	(France) Henri Greder (France) Alain Cudini	Chevrolet Corvette C3	Chevrolet 7.0L V8	MI	0	Oil pump (1hr)

=== Did Not Start ===
Pos	Class	No	Team	Drivers	Chassis	Engine	Tyre	Reason
DNS	GTX	45	(United States) North American Racing Team	(United States) Ronnie Bucknum (Italy) Carlo Facetti	Ferrari 365 GTB/4	Ferrari 4.4L V12	MI	Withdrawn
DNS	GTS	46	(United States) North American Racing Team	(France) Jean-Pierre Malcher (France) Patrick Langlois	Ferrari 365 GTB/4 Michelotti Spider	Ferrari 4.4L V12	MI	Withdrawn
DNS	GTS	62	(Spain) Escuderia Montjuïch	(Spain) Juan Fernández (Ecuador) Francisco Pérez (Ecuador) Andrés Chiriboga	Porsche 911 Carrera RSR	Porsche 3.0L F6	MI	Practice accident
DNS	GTX	99	(United States) North American Racing Team	(France) Lucien Guitteny (France) Jacky Haran	Ferrari 365 GTB/4 Berlinetta Boxer	Ferrari 4.4L V12	MI	Withdrawn
DNQ	S 3.0	2	Ecuador Marlboro Team (private entrant)	(Ecuador) Guillermo Ortega (Ecuador) Lothar Ranft	Porsche 908/02	Porsche 3.0L F8	G	Did not qualify
DNQ	S 3.0	9	Ecuador Marlboro Team (private entrant)	(Ecuador) Fausto Merello (Ecuador) Francisco Madera (Ecuador) Louis Larrea	Porsche 911 Carrera RS	Porsche 3.0L F6	D	Did not qualify
DNQ	S 3.0	17	(United States) North American Racing Team	(United Kingdom) Richard Bond (Italy) Giancarlo Gagliardi (United States) Harley Cluxton	Dino 308 GT4 LM	Ferrari 2.9L V8	G	Did not qualify
DNQ	S 2.0	33	(France) J.-L. Gama (private entrant)	(France) Jean-Louis Gama (France) Franc Leclercq (France) “Deneulin”	GLD 910/6	Porsche 1991cc F6	G	Did not qualify
DNQ	GTX	34	(France) P. Rilly (private entrant)	(France) Paul Rilly (France) Roger Le Veve	Lamborghini Islero	Lamborghini 3.9L V12	MI	Did not qualify
DNQ	S 2.0	39	(France) M. Lateste (private entrant)	(France) Michel Lateste (France) Gilbert Sedergo	Sederap	Cosworth BDG 1844cc S4	F	Did not qualify
DNQ	GT	54	(Switzerland) A. Pallavicini (private entrant)	(Switzerland) Angelo Pallavicini (Italy) Marco Vanoli	Porsche 911 Carrera RS	Porsche 3.0 F6	D	Did not qualify
DNQ	GTS	70	(France) Les Maisons de Week-End (private entrant)	(France) Jean-Louis Ravenel (France) Jacky Ravenel (Belgium) Dany Wauters	Porsche 911 Carrera RS	Porsche 3.0 F6	D	Did not qualify
DNQ	GTS	73	(France) T. Perrier (private entrant)	(France) Thierry Perrier (France) Jean Belliard	Porsche 911S	Porsche 2.3L F6	MI	Did not qualify
DNQ	GT	75	(Switzerland) Wicky Racing Team	(Switzerland) André Wicky (France) José Thibault (France) Elio Cogo (Switzerland) Philippe Carron	De Tomaso Pantera	Ford 5.8L V8	MI	Did not qualify
DNQ	TS	89	(France) M. Guicherd (private entrant)	(France) Michel Guicherd (France) Jean-Claude Géral (France) Christian Avril	Chrysler Hemicuda	Chrysler Hemi 7.0L V8	MI	Did not qualify
DNQ	TS	94	(France) Shark Team	(France) Christian Gouttepifre (France) Jean-Pierre Bodin	Ford Capri RS	Ford 3.0L V6	D	Did not qualify

=== Class Winners ===
Class	Winning car	Winning drivers
Group 5 S Sports Over 2-litre	#11 Gulf-Mirage GR8	Ickx / Bell
Group 5 S Sports Under 2-litre	#35 Moynet LM75	Hoepfner / Mouton / Dacremont
Group 4 GTS Special GT	#58 Porsche 911 Carrera RSR	Fitzpatrick / van Lennep / Hezemans / Schurti
Group 3 GT Production GT	#84 Porsche 911 Carrera RS	Maurer / Baez / Strähl *
GTX Le Mans Experimental	#20 Porsche 911 Carrera RSR Turbo	Haldi / Béguin / Zbinden *
Group 2 TS Special Touring	#91 BMW 2002 Ti	Brillat / Gagliardi / Degoumois

- Note: setting a new class distance record.

=== Index of Thermal Efficiency ===
Pos	Class	No	Team	Drivers	Chassis	Score
1	GT	87	(France) X Racing	(France) Philippe Demagne (France) René Boubet	Porsche 911S	19
2	GT	84	(Switzerland) G. Maurer (private entrant)	(Switzerland) Gerhard Maurer (Switzerland) Christian Baez (Switzerland) Eugen Strähl	Porsche 911 Carrera RS	20
3	GTS	55	(France) Écurie Robert Buchet	(France) Claude Ballot-Léna (Canada) Jacques Bienvenue	Porsche 911 Carrera RSR	20
4	GTS	53	(France) ASA Cachia-Bondy	(France) Henri Cachia (France) Jacques Borras (France) Pascal Moisson	Porsche 911 Carrera RSR	20
5	GTS	58	(Germany) Gelo Racing Team	(Netherlands) Gijs van Lennep (United Kingdom) John Fitzpatrick (Liechtenstein) Manfred Schurti (Netherlands) Toine Hezemans	Porsche 911 Carrera RSR	20
6	GT	77	(France) P. Dagoreau (private entrant)	(France) Philippe Dagoreau (France) Thierry Sabine (Switzerland) Jean-Pierre Aeschlimann	Porsche 911 Carrera RS	22
7	GTS	65	(Germany) Porsche Kremer Racing Team	(Mexico) Juan Carlos Bolaños (Mexico) Andres Contreras (United States) Billy Sprowls	Porsche 911 Carrera RSR	23
8	GT	67	(France) A.-C. Verney (private entrant)	(France) Anne-Charlotte Verney (Belgium) Yvette Fontaine (France) Corinne Tarnaud	Porsche 911 Carrera RS	25
9	GTS	69	(Belgium) "Beurlys" (private entrant)	(Belgium) “Beurlys” (Jean Blaton) (United Kingdom) Nick Faure (United Kingdom) John Cooper	Porsche 911 Carrera RSR	25
10	S 3.0	5	(France) Automobiles Ligier Gitanes	(France) Jean-Louis Lafosse (France) Guy Chasseuil	Ligier JS2	26

- Note: Only the top ten positions are included in this set of standings.

=== Fuel Consumption Prize ===
Pos	Class	No	Team	Drivers	Chassis	Score
1	S 2.0	30	(France) J.-M. Lemerle (private entrant)	(France) Jean-Marie Lemerle (France) Patrick Daire (France) Alain Levié	Lola T292	23
2	S 2.0	23	(United Kingdom) Madison Racing Team	(United Kingdom) Richard Knight (United Kingdom) Mike Knight (France) “Cyprien” (Christian Mons]	March 75S	25
3	S 2.0	38	(United Kingdom) Rays Racing	(United Kingdom) Nigel Clarkson (United Kingdom) Derek Worthington	Lola T292/294	25
4	S 2.0	35	(France) Société Esso (private entrant)	(France) Michèle Mouton (France) Marianne Hoepfner (France) Christine Dacremont	Moynet LM75	25
5	GT	87	(France) X Racing	(France) Philippe Demagne (France) René Boubet	Porsche 911S	26
6	S 2.0	28	(France) Société Racing Organisation Course	(France) François Sérvanin (France) Jacques Henry (France) Albert Dufrène	Lola T294	26

- Note: Only the top six positions are included in this set of standings, which is a ranking of the cars using the least volume of fuel during the race.

=== Statistics ===
Taken from Quentin Spurring's book, officially licensed by the ACO

- Fastest Lap in practice –J.Ickx, #11 Gulf-Mirage GR8 – 3:49.9secs; 213.59 km/h (132.72 mph)
- Fastest Lap – C. Craft, #4 Lola T380 – 3:53.8secs; 210.03 km/h (130.51 mph)
- Winning Distance – 4,595.58 km (2,855.56 mi)
- Winner's Average Speed – 191.50 km/h (118.99 mph)
- Attendance – ~80000

Citations
