= Gayrard =

Gayrard is a French surname. Notable people with the surname include:

- André Gayrard (1923–2014), French politician
- Raymond Gayrard (1807–1855), French sculptor, son of Raymond (père)
- Raymond Gayrard (père) (1777–1858), French sculptor, father of Raymond
- Véronique Gayrard, French mathematician

== See also ==
- Gérard
