= Gérard Crombac =

Swiss motorsport journalist (1929–2005)

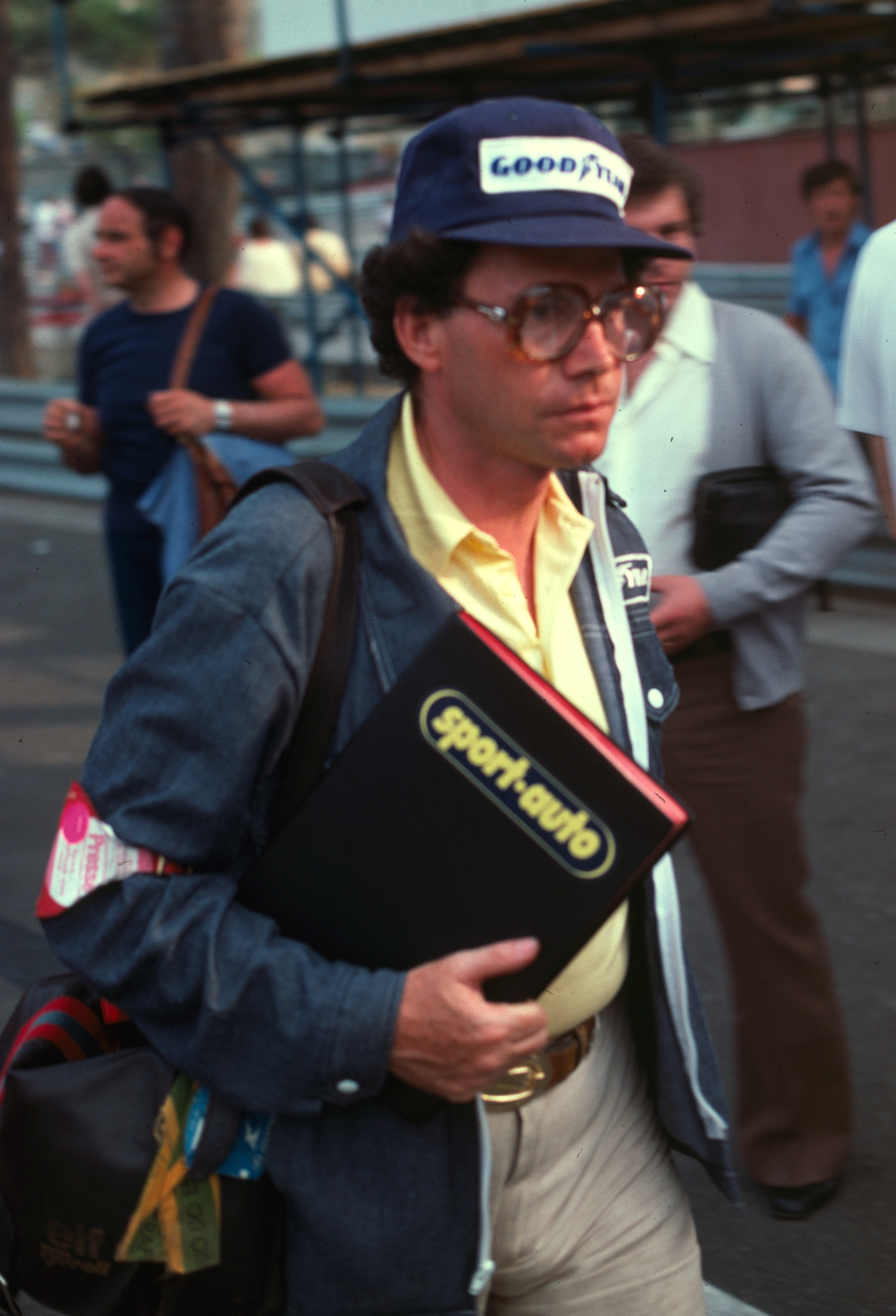
- Crombac at the 1976 Monaco Grand Prix
- Born: 7 March 1929; Zurich, Switzerland
- Died: 18 November 2005 (aged 76); Paris, France
- Other names: Jabby
- Occupations: Journalist; Author

Gérard "Jabby" Crombac (7 March 1929, Zurich – 18 November 2005, Paris) was a Swiss auto-racing journalist and author.

== Biography ==
In 1954 Crombac bought the Lotus Mark VI previously owned by Lotus founder Colin Chapman and began racing with this car. While this marked the start of a long friendship with Chapman, Crombac realised he was not racing driver material, and stood down in 1958.

In 1959 he began managing the interests of Jo Schlesser in association with Jean Lucas, while working for French discount retailer Prisunic.

In 1962, after leaving Prisunic, Crombac partnered with Lucas to found the French magazine Sport Auto, where he was chief editor until 1989. In 1973 he and a Sport Auto team composed of Thierry Lalande, Luc Melua and Jean-Louis Moncet, assembled a kitcar in one week-end.

He shared an apartment in Paris with racer Jim Clark during the time that Clark listed his official residence as Switzerland for tax purposes.

In 2001, Crombac launched a new magazine called Formula 1 Magazine (renamed F1i Magazine in 2003) with Pierre van Vliet. During five years, he had several columns on racing history. He wrote his last one for the November 2005 issue, called Filer à l'anglaise.

Crombac and his wife Catherine had a son, who was named Colin James in honour of close friends Chapman and Clark.

Crombac died from cancer in a hospice in Paris on 18 November 2005. His funeral was held on 28 November 2005 at the Crematorium in Père Lachaise Cemetery in Paris. It was attended by three-time Formula One champion Jackie Stewart. In August 2007, in accordance with his wishes, his ashes were scattered in the Gulf of Saint-Tropez, where he lived during his last few years.

== Publications ==
=== Biography/autobiography ===
- Crombac, Gérard (1 December 1986). Colin Chapman: The Man and His Cars. Patrick Stephens Limited. ISBN 978-0850597332.
- Crombac, Gérard (14 December 2007). En Première Ligne — Mes 578 Grands Prix de Formule 1 [On the front line — My 578 Formula 1 Grands Prix] (in French). Editions Anthèse. ISBN 978-2912257369.

=== Racing and racing cars ===
- Crombac, Gérard (1 January 1989). Turbine Grand Prix. Automobilia. ISBN 978-8885880023.
- Crombac, Gérard (1 May 2001). Les années Clark 1956-1965. Editions Techniques pour l'Automobile et l'Industrie. ISBN 978-2726884645.
- Crombac, Gérard (1 June 1999). 50 Ans de Formule 1 : Tome 1, Les années Fangio. Editions Techniques pour l'Automobile et l'Industrie. ISBN 978-2726883365.
- Crombac, Gérard (January 1, 1973). Cars in Profile No. 10: Matra MS80. Profile Publications.

=== Road cars ===
- Crombac, Gérard (1991). Lotus Esprit. Automobilia. ISBN 978-8885880375.
