= Luc Méloua =

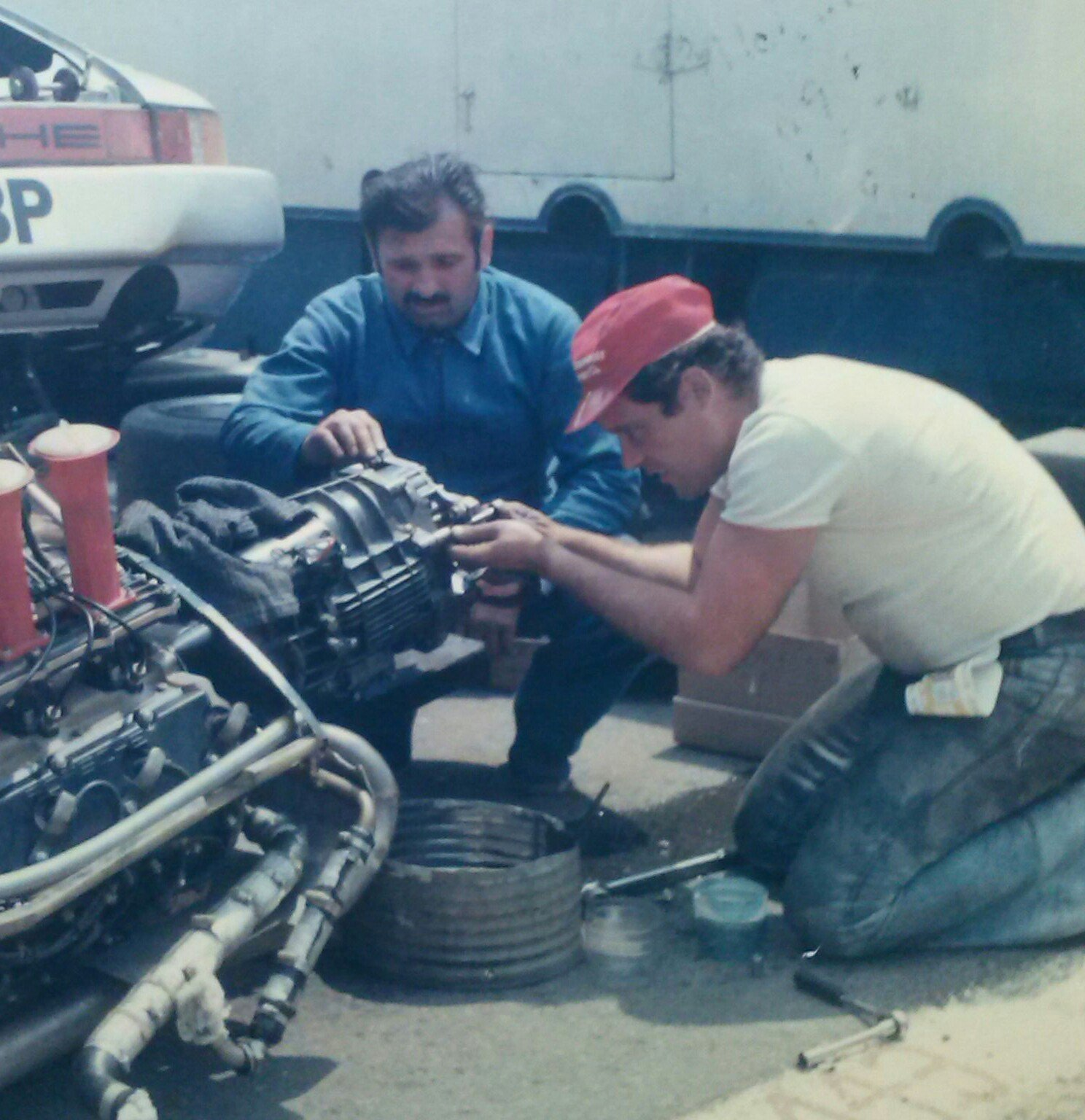
Méloua (in the blue shirt), 24 Hours of Le Mans 1975 (Meznarie Team, Porsche)

Luc Méloua (27 December 1936 – 17 December 2010), ლუკა მელუა in Georgian, was a French motorist and journalist.

== Early life ==
Méloua was born in Paris, France, to Georgian parents who had left their country after the Russian Red Army's invasion. Growing up near the Montlhéry circuit, Méloua developed a fascination with motorcycles and cars. He graduated from the Technical Institute of Aeroplane and Car Design (Ecole supérieure de techniques aéronautiques et de construction automobile, ESTACA).

== Career ==
At ESTACA he met two future French drivers, Jean-Pierre Beltoise (Formula One) and Jean-Louis Marnat (24 Hours of Le Mans). He joined the French flight-test center (Centre d’essais en vol) of Brétigny-sur-Orge, and began to work as both a motorist and journalist.

=== Motorist ===
At the end of the 1950s, and in the 1960s, Méloua was a technical officer for the French Federation of Motorcycles (FFM) and an engines controller for races such as Bol d'or, Coupe du Salon and the Lapize hill climbing event.

In 1973, with three journalists from the French magazine Sport Auto (Gérard Crombac, Thierry Lalande and Jean-Louis Moncet), he built a low-cost kit car in two days.

Later, he worked with racing teams in various disciplines: kart (French championship with Brétigny-sur-Orge Club), rally (Louis Meznarie team with NSU cars and Danna team with General Motors), circuit (24 Hours of Le Mans with Louis Meznarie team, Porsche) and motorcycle (Yamaha team).

=== Journalist ===
At twenty, as a freelance journalist for mechanical sports, he joined La Gazette de l’Île-de-France, a local newspaper published by two journalists coming from the French Resistance, Yann Poilvet and Joseph Barsalou.

He wrote for other newspapers, including local newspaper Le Republicain, national newspaper Le Parisien, Spanish magazine Cars and Motorcycles and French magazine Sport Auto.

In 2003, with the Professor Claude Parmentier, his brother Mirian, and the Georgian Embassy in France, Méloua organized the first annual "French and Georgian Day", in Leuville-sur-Orge village, where the Georgian Government was exiled in 1921. In 2005 he published a list of one thousand Georgian people (historical personalities and other residents) buried in Georgian Square area in the village cemetery of Leuville-sur-Orge. In 2007, he published the Net revue Georgian News in French, English and Georgian languages.

== Books ==
Méloua published three books:

- Le Gonflage des moteurs
- La Préparation des moteurs
- Compresseurs et Turbos, la suralimentation.

These books are used in French institutes and universities for teaching mechanics.

He also wrote a book on car aerodynamics with Geoffrey Howard, titled Aérodynamique automobile (1988).
