= Cyrille Schott =

French civil servant (1950–2026)

Puisne Judge of the Cour des Comptes
- In office 14 January 2009 – 17 October 2013

Prefect of Hérault
- In office 20 June 2007 – 11 December 2008
- Preceded by: Michel Thénault
- Succeeded by: Claude Baland

Prefect of Calvados
- In office 9 July 2004 – 16 July 2007
- Preceded by: Didier Cultiaux
- Succeeded by: Michel Bart

Prefect of Pas-de-Calais
- In office 10 December 2001 – 11 July 2004
- Preceded by: Jean Dussourd
- Succeeded by: Denis Prieur

Prefect of Seine-et-Marne
- In office 22 January 1998 – 23 November 2001
- Preceded by: Didier Cultiaux
- Succeeded by: Bernard Coquet

Prefect of Haut-Rhin
- In office 8 August 1994 – 22 January 1998
- Preceded by: François Bonnelle
- Succeeded by: Bernard Bonnet

Prefect of Indre-et-Loire
- In office 5 June 1992 – 8 August 1994
- Preceded by: François Leblond
- Succeeded by: Daniel Cadoux

Prefect of Nièvre
- In office July 1990 – 5 June 1992
- Preceded by: Jacques Lambert
- Succeeded by: Bernard Prévost

Prefect of the Territoire de Belfort
- In office 14 October 1987 – 9 November 1987
- Preceded by: Serge Thirioux
- Succeeded by: Didier Cultiaux

Personal details
- Born: Marie Cyrille Joseph Schott; 27 October 1950 Drusenheim, France
- Died: 4 April 2026 (aged 75)
- Education: École nationale d'administration Institut d'études politiques de Strasbourg
- Occupation: Civil servant

picture of Cyrille Schott

Marie Cyrille Joseph Schott (French: [maʁˈi siʁˈij ʒozˈɛf ʃˈɔt]; 27 October 1950 – 4 April 2026) was a French civil servant.

== Life and career ==
Born in Drusenheim on 27 October 1950, Schott was the son of the commune's former mayor, Pierre Schott. He attended the Institut d'études politiques de Strasbourg and the École nationale d'administration. He served as a squadron leader in the French Armed Forces and became a colonel in the military reserve. He ended his military service in 1973.

In 1982, Schott joined the office of President François Mitterrand, where he organized office meetings and supervised affairs with Andorra. In 1987, he was appointed prefect of the Territoire de Belfort, where he supported the development of the Université de technologie de Belfort-Montbéliard and the Revenu minimum d'insertion. In 1990, he was appointed prefect of Nièvre, where he oversaw the first Formula 1 activity conducted at the Circuit de Nevers Magny-Cours and was recognized by the Formula One Constructors' Association. He also advocated for a major roadway connecting Nevers to Paris while managing agricultural challenges and stimulated local contracts for farmers. From 1992 to 1994, he was prefect of Indre-et-Loire, where he was recognized by La Nouvelle République du Centre-Ouest for his environmental advocacy. As prefect of Haut-Rhin, he oversaw the construction of the EuroAirport Basel Mulhouse Freiburg. When he was prefect of Seine-et-Marne, he dealt with challenges such as civil unrest in Dammarie-lès-Lys, foot-and-mouth disease outbreaks from atrazine contamination, and opposition to his approach to tourism. He gained some notoriety while serving as prefect of Pas-de-Calais due to his response to an outbreak of Legionnaires' disease and assisting in economic recovery after the closure of a Metaleurop plant in Noyelles-Godault.

In December 2008, Schott was named Préfet hors cadre, or a prefect without a specific territorial assignment. On 14 January 2009, he became a Puisne Judge of the Cour des Comptes. On 6 March 2014, he succeeded André-Michel Ventre as director of the National Institute for Advanced Security and Justice Studies. On 28 October 2016, he retired from public service. In 2020, he became president of the Bas-Rhin section of the Société des membres de la Légion d'honneur.

Schott died on 4 April 2026, at the age of 75.

== Works ==
- Jardin des délices (2008)
- La rose & le lys – François Mitterrand et le comte de Paris 1986-1996 (2011)
- Un Alsacien, préfet en Alsace (2018)
- Parole de Préfet : Sarkozy, Frêche et les autres… (2020)
- Souveraineté et solidarité, un défi européen (2021)
- Le Génie historique du Christianisme (2023)

== Decorations ==
- Knight (1998) and Officer (2014) of the Legion of Honour
- Officer (1994) and Commander (2003) of the Ordre national du Mérite
