= Jürgen Barth =

German racing driver (born 1947)

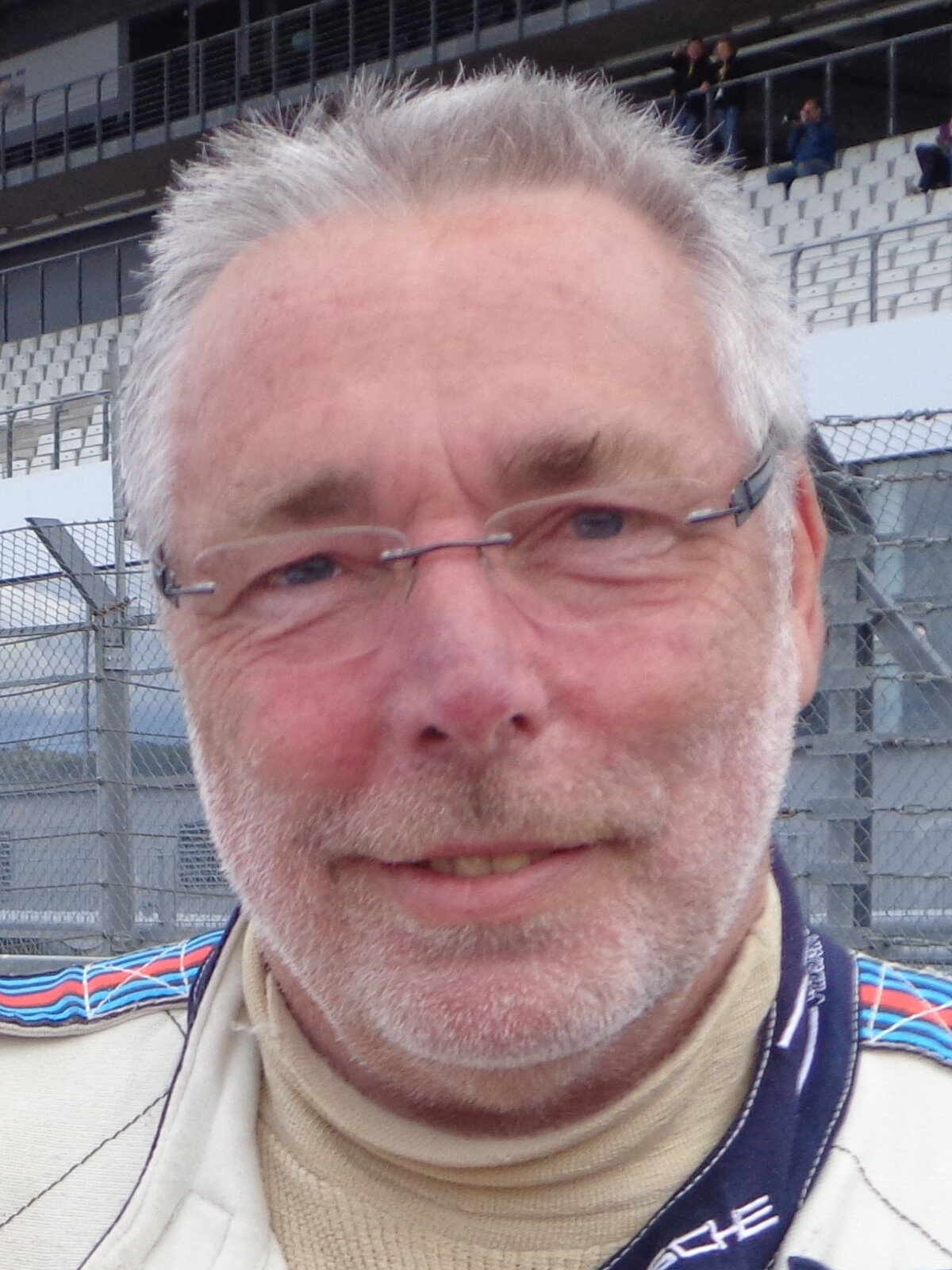
- Barth in 2013
- Nationality: (Germany) German
- Born: 10 December 1947 (age 78) Thum, Saxony, Germany
- Relatives: Edgar Barth (father)

24 Hours of Le Mans career
- Years: 1971 – 1982, 1993
- Teams: R. Mazzia; L. Meznarie; Gelo Racing Team; Joest Racing; Porsche System; Essex Motorsport Porsche; Larbre Compétition
- Best finish: 1st (1977)
- Class wins: 4 (1972, 1977, 1981, 1993)

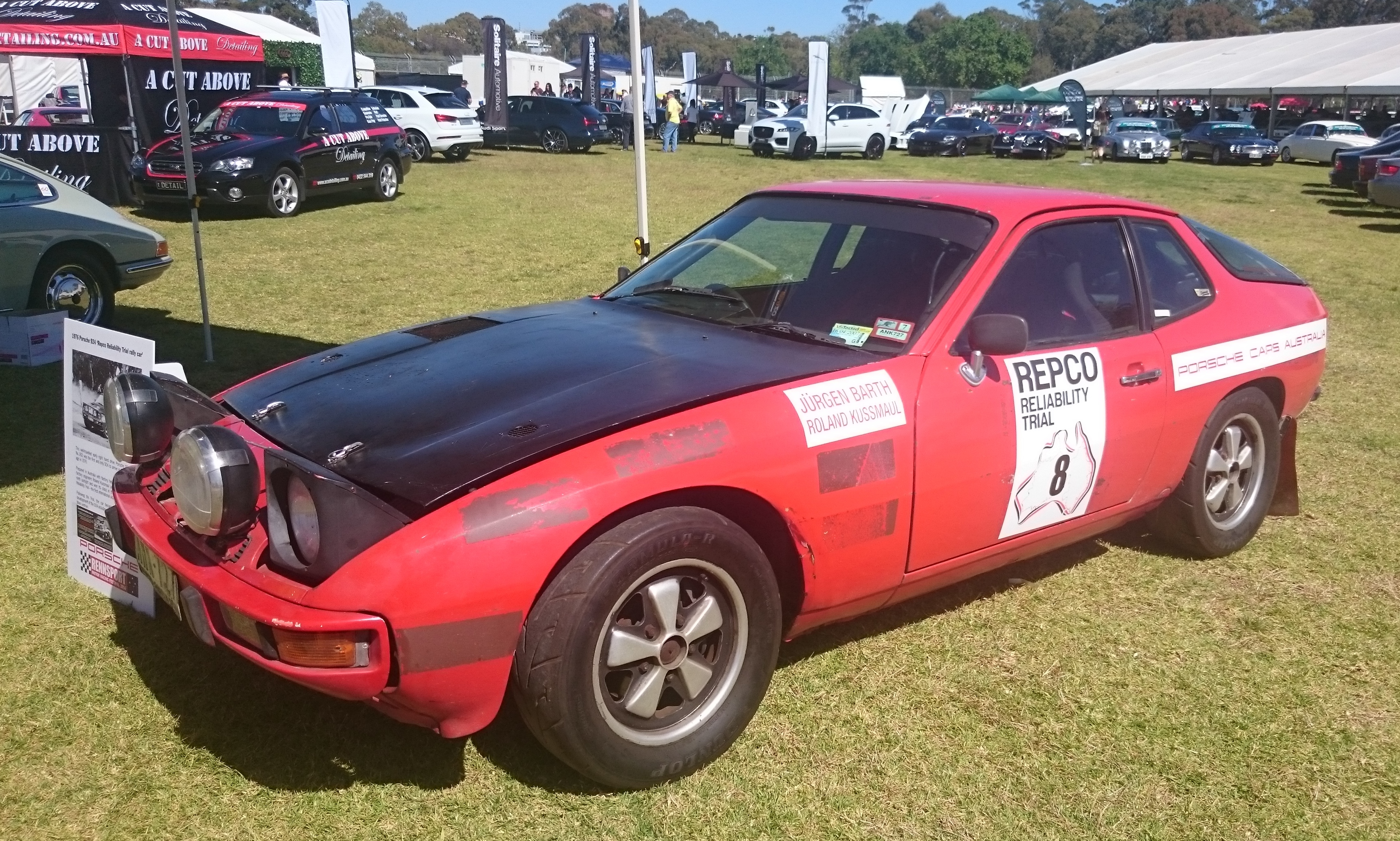
The Porsche 924 in which Jürgen Barth and Roland Kushmaul placed ninth outright in the 1979 Repco Reliability Trial. The car is pictured in 2016.

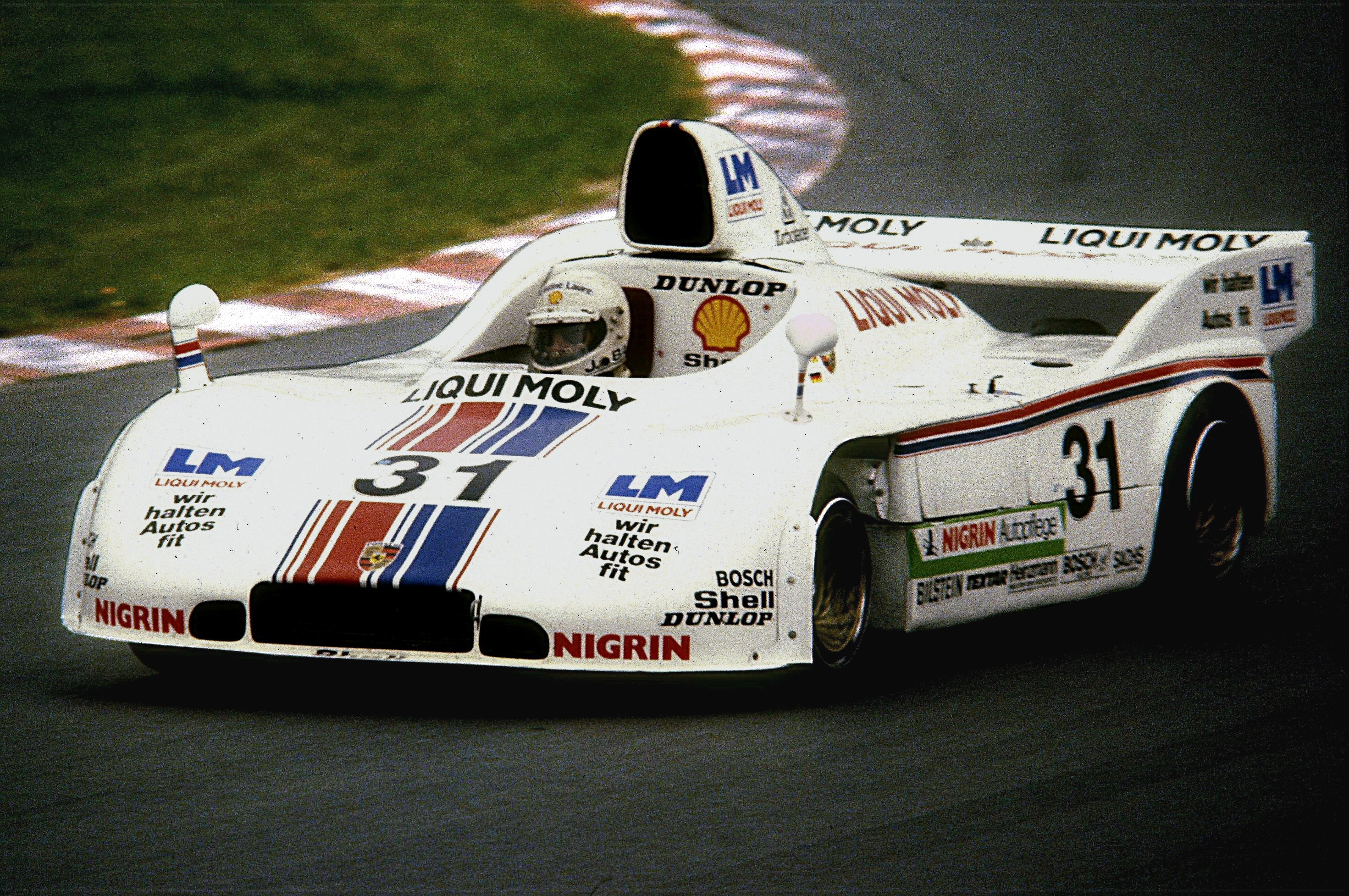
Jürgen Barth 1980, driving a Porsche 908 at the Nürburgring

Jürgen Barth (born 10 December 1947 in Thum, Saxony) is a German former racecar driver. He is the son of Formula One driver and sports car racer Edgar Barth.

Barth started out as an engineer but became one of the most successful drivers in sports car racing. He won the Le Mans 24 Hours in 1977 in a Porsche 936, with Jacky Ickx and Hurley Haywood, and in 1980, he won the 1000 km Nürburgring with Rolf Stommelen.

Barth is co-author of the book about Porsche's racing history, Das große Buch der Porschetypen, and later would help in the creation of the BPR Global GT Series.

== 24 Hours of Le Mans results ==
Year	Team	Co-Drivers	Car	Class	Laps	Pos.	Class Pos.
1971	(France) René Mazzia	(France) René Mazzia	Porsche 911EC	GT +2.0	303	8	2nd
1972	(France) Louis Meznarie	(Switzerland) Sylvain Garant (United States) Michael Keyser	Porsche 911 S	GT 3.0	285	13	1st
1973	(Germany) Gelo Racing Team	(Germany) Georg Loos	Porsche 911 Carrera RSR	GT 3.0	311	10	2nd
1974	(Germany) Polifac Gelo Racing Team	(Germany) Franz Pesch	Porsche 911 Carrera RSR	GT		DNF	DNF
1975	(Germany) Ovoro Joest Racing	(Italy) Mario Casoni (Germany) Reinhold Jöst	Porsche 908LH	S 3.0	325	4th	4th
1976	(Germany) Martini Racing Joest	(Germany) Reinhold Jöst	Porsche 936 Spyder	S 3.0		DNF	DNF
1977	(Germany) Martini Racing Porsche System	(Belgium) Jacky Ickx (United States) Hurley Haywood	Porsche 936/77	S +2.0	342	1st	1st
1978	(Germany) Martini Racing Porsche System	(France) Bob Wollek (Belgium) Jacky Ickx	Porsche 936/78	S +2.0	364	2nd	2nd
1979	(Germany) Essex Motorsport Porsche	(Belgium) Jacky Ickx (United Kingdom) Brian Redman	Porsche 936	S +2.0	200	DNF	DNF
1980	(Germany) Porsche System	(Liechtenstein) Manfred Schurti	Porsche 924 Carrera GT	GTP	316	6	3rd
1981	(Germany) Porsche System	(Germany) Walter Röhrl	Porsche 944 LM	GTP +3.0	323	7	1st
1982	(Germany) Rothmans Porsche System	(United States) Al Holbert (United States) Hurley Haywood	Porsche 956	C	340	3rd	3rd
1993	(France) Monaco Media International (France) Larbre Compétition	(France) Joël Gouhier (France) Dominique Dupuy	Porsche 911 Carrera RSR	GT	304	15th	1st

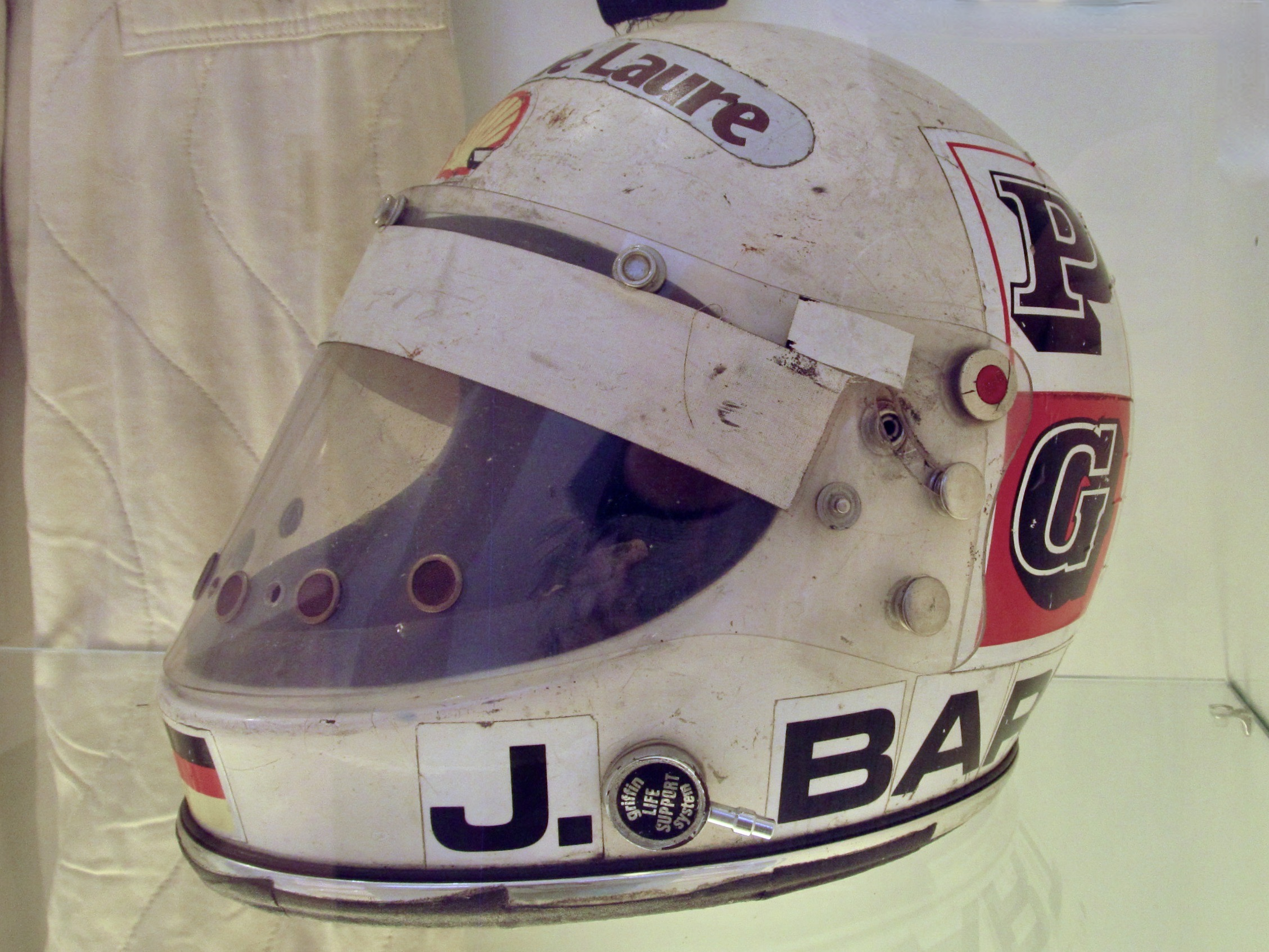
Jürgen Barth racing helmet at the Prototyp Museum, Hamburg, Germany.

== See also ==
- Louis Meznarie

== Bibliography ==
- Lothar Boschen & Jürgen Barth (1977). Das große Buch der Porsche-Typen, (in German). Motorbuch Verlag. 3879434546.
- Gustav Büsing & Jürgen Barth (1 April 2005). Das neue große Buch der Porsche-Typen, (in German). Motorbuch Verlag. ISBN 978-3613024380.

Sporting positions
Preceded by Jacky Ickx; Gijs van Lennep	Winner of the 24 Hours of Le Mans; 1977 with: Jacky Ickx; Hurley Haywood	Succeeded by Jean-Pierre Jaussaud; Didier Pironi
