= Jean Lucas (racing driver) =

French racing driver (1917–2003)

- Born: 25 April 1917; Le Mans, Sarthe
- Died: 27 September 2003 (aged 86); Saint-Martin-de-Ré, Charente-Maritime

Formula One World Championship career
- Nationality: French
- Active years: 1955
- Team: Gordini
- Entries: 1
- Championships: 0
- Wins: 0
- Podiums: 0
- Career points: 0
- Pole positions: 0
- Fastest laps: 0
- First entry: 1955 Italian Grand Prix

Jean Lucas (25 April 1917 – 27 September 2003) was a French racing driver. He participated in one Formula One World Championship Grand Prix, on 11 September 1955. Lucas was then manager of the Gordini team, and when regular driver Robert Manzon was unable to race, he stepped in to take his place. His retired his car with engine failure and scored no championship points.

Lucas' best results as a driver were in sports car racing at the wheel of a Ferrari, winning at Spa-Francorchamps and Montlhéry in 1949. He retired in 1957 after a crash at the Moroccan Grand Prix.

Lucas was one of the founders of the French motorsport magazine Sport auto.

== Complete Formula One World Championship results ==
(key)

Year	Entrant	Chassis	Engine	1	2	3	4	5	6	7	WDC	Points
1955	Equipe Gordini	Gordini Type 32	Gordini Straight-8	ARG	MON	500	BEL	NED	GBR	ITA; Ret	NC	0
