= Gérard Vachonfrance =

French physician (1933–2008)

Gérard Vachonfrance (30 March 1933, in Roubaix – 31 December 2008), was a French physician. He was a co-founder of the Société française d'alcoologie (French Society of Alcohology).

Vachonfrance and Pierre Fouquet were pioneers of alcohology as a medical discipline. He was a psychiatrist and psychoanalyst open to unorthodox practices such as transactional analysis. He was an unconditional supporter of discussion groups and mutual assistance.
