= Gérard Bougrier =

French civil servant

- Born: 30 November 1944 (age 80); Rennes, Ille-et-Vilaine, France
- Occupation: French prefect

Gérard Bougrier (born 1944) is a French civil servant (prefect).

He was born on 30 November 1944 in Rennes, Ille-et-Vilaine, Brittany.

He is a graduate of the Institut d’études politiques de Bordeaux (IEP Bordeaux).

== Career ==
- 1982 - 1985 : sub-prefect of La Flèche in La Flèche City
- 1993 - 8 February 1996 : sub-prefect of Antony in Antony City
- 8 February 1996 - 10 November 1997 : préfet adjoint pour la sécurité auprès des préfets de la Corse-du-Sud et de la Haute-Corse (deputy prefect for the security to the prefects of Corse-du-Sud and of Haute-Corse)
- 10 November 1997 - 6 January 2000 : prefect of Hautes-Pyrénées in Tarbes
- 6 January 2000 - 1 August 2003 : prefect of Aude in Carcassonne

== Honours and awards ==
- France:
  - Officier (Officer) of Légion d’honneur

Gérard Bougrier French Prefect Born: 1944
Political offices
Preceded by Jean Dussourd	Prefect of Hautes-Pyrénées; 1997 – 2000	Succeeded by Jean-Claude Bastion
Preceded by Christian Decharrière	Prefect of Aude; 2000 – 2003	Succeeded by Jean-Claude Bastion
