= Gérard Barreaux =

Gérard Barreaux (1948 – 16 October 2010) was a French accordionist, composer, and actor. He regularly appeared in performances of Yiddish music with singer-guitarist Moshé Leiser and violinist Ami Flamer.

== Discography ==
- fr:Denis Levaillant
- Yankele, Yiddish songs
