= Sport auto (France) =

French automobile magazine

Sport-Auto is a leading French automobile magazine. The magazine specializes in sport and luxury cars.

== History and profile ==
The magazine appeared first in 1962. It is part of and published by Editions Mondadori Axel Springer (EMAS), a joint company of the Mondadori France publishing group and Axel Springer France on a monthly basis. EMAS acquired the magazine in 2009. The headquarters of the monthly is in Paris.

Jean Lucas and Gérard "Jabby" Crombac were its chief editors from 1962 to 1989. One of its directors was Jose Rosinski who co-founded the magazine.

In 1973, Gérard Crombac, Thierry Lalande, Luc Melua and Jean-Louis Moncet, journalists with the magazine, assembled a kit "fun sport car" in a week-end for a low cost and got a mediatic success.
