= Gérard Miquel =

French politician

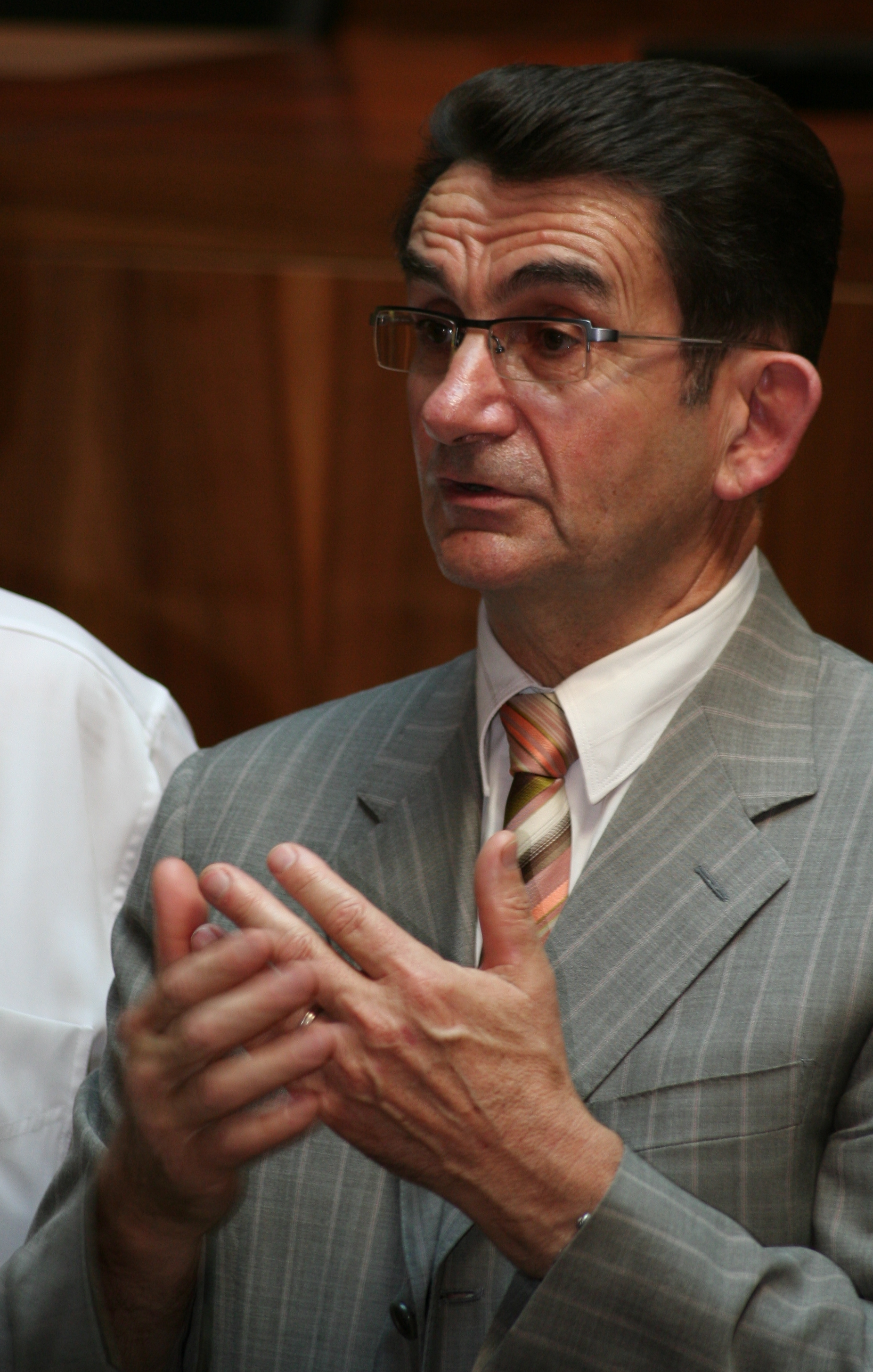
Gérard Miquel

Gérard Miquel (born 17 June 1946) was a member of the Senate of France, representing the Lot department from 1992 to 2017. He was a member of the Socialist Party, until he changed to La République En Marche! in 2017.
