= Gérard Geisbusch =

Luxembourgish-Norwegian footballer

Personal information
- Date of birth: 4 May 1988 (age 38)
- Place of birth: Luxembourg City, Luxembourg
- Position: Midfielder

Senior career*
Years	Team	Apps	(Gls)
2007–2014	CS Fola Esch		

International career^{‡}
2008	Luxembourg	2	(0)
- * Club domestic league appearances and goals as of 27 June 2023 ‡ National team caps and goals as of 29 January 2010

Gérard Geisbusch (born 4 May 1988) is a former Luxembourgish-Norwegian football midfielder, who played for Luxembourg National Division side CS Fola Esch.

== International career ==
Has played for the Luxembourg national football team twice.
