= Gérard Aristote Zaonarivelo =

Malagasy politician

Gérard Aristote Zaonarivelo is a Malagasy politician. A member of the National Assembly of Madagascar, he was elected as a member of the Tiako I Madagasikara party; he represents the constituency of Mananjary.
