= Gérard Masson =

French composer (born 1936)

Gérard Masson (born 12 August, 1936, in Paris) is a French composer.

== Biography ==
Gérard Masson grew up listening to jazz, played jazz trumpet, and began studying the piano in 1945, but had no formal training in composition until, after military service in Algeria, he returned to France in 1962. He approached Max Deutsch, who sent Masson to one of his students for lessons in counterpoint. At about this same time, he made the acquaintance of Pierre Souvtchinsky, who introduced him to Igor Stravinsky. Masson brought to his meeting with Stravinsky his first orchestral score, Dans le deuil des vagues, in which Stravinsky showed considerable interest. When, upon returning to the United States, Stravinsky was asked by a reporter whether he had heard any young musicians, Stravinsky replied, "none at all, except Gérard Masson". It was Souvtchinsky who suggested that Masson go to Cologne to study with Karlheinz Stockhausen, which he did in 1965–66 and again in 1966–67. He was particularly impressed by Momente, about which Stockhausen lectured at the Cologne Courses for New Music in those years.

== Style and technique ==
Though an admirer of Stockhausen's music, Masson's attitude toward serialism is ambivalent:

I have never really felt at home with serialism. I make use of it, initially because I am terrified to know what I should do. And logic can occupy me for five minutes, but it ends by annoying me very quickly. Often, a schema precedes the piece and it takes form as I write the work. I write once, then I edit, like in the cinema. The beginning of Adlib, for example, has seen half-a-dozen versions. This cost me two years of work.

His early orchestral composition Dans le deuil des vagues II (1968) showed some influence of Debussy, but also of earlier music.

== Compositions ==
- Pièce pour quatorze instruments et percussions, for flute, oboe, clarinet, saxophone, bassoon, horn, trumpet, trombone, electric guitar, harp, cello, and 3 percussionists (1965)
- Dans le deuil des vagues I, for orchestra (1966)
- Ouest I, for alto flute, clarinet, bass clarinet, bassoon, trumpet, trombone, piano, harp, violin, and cello (1967)
- Dans le deuil des vagues II, for orchestra (1968)
- Ouest II, for mezzo-soprano, flute, cor anglais, clarinet, bass clarinet, bassoon, trumpet, trombone, 2 violins, viola, cello, piano, and harp (1969)
- Bleu loin, for 12 strings (1970)
- Hymnopsie, for choir and orchestra (1972)
- String Quartet No. 1 (1973)
- Sextet for flute, oboe, clarinet, bass clarinet, bassoon, and horn (1975)
- Piano Concerto No. 1, for piano and orchestra (1977)
- Quintet for mezzo-soprano, clarinet (doubling bass clarinet), piano, violin, and viola (1978)
- Pas seulement des moments des moyens d’amour…, for two pianos and orchestra (1980)
- Alto-septuor, for 2 violins, viola, cello, flute, alto oboe, clarinet, bass clarinet, basson, 2 trumpets, horn, trombone, tuba, piano, harp, and tape (1981)
- Renseignements sur Apollon I, for two pianos (1982)
- Duo for violin and viola (1982)
- W3A6M4, for violin, viola, and chamber orchestra (1983)
- Piano solo (1983)
- Gymnastique de l'éponge, for piano, woodwinds, and strings (1984)
- Alto-tambour, for violin, viola, and 12 strings (1985)
- Sonate Souvtchinsky, for violin and piano (1986)
- Saxophones Fourcade, for saxophone quartet (1987)
- Contreblanc basse, for solo double bass, clarinet, bass clarinet, marimba, celesta, and string quartet (1988)
- Renseignements sur Apollon II, for two pianos (1988)
- CBCB, for bass clarinet and double bass (1988)
- Offs, for orchestra (1989)
- Minutes de Saint-Simon, for saxophone and piano (1989)
- Alors les tuyaux, for 2 clarinets, basset horn, bass clarinet,contrabass clarinet, 4 horns, 2 percussionists, viola, cello, and double bass (1989)
- Piano Concerto No. 2, for piano and 12 strings (1990)
- Mélisande 1 mètre 60 de désespoir, for viola and piano (1990)
- Après-midi d'Hamlet, for piano and choir (1990)
- La mort de Germanicus, for cello and piano (1991)
- Surimpression, for two pianos (1991)
- Bud, for orchestra (1991)
- Hlet solo (piano (1991)
- String Quartet No. 2 (1991)
- Hbap, for oboe d'amour and piano (1992)
- Smonk, for piano (1992)
- Renseignements sur Apollon III, for two pianos (1994)
- Trop nuisible pour punir, for clarinet, violin, cello, and piano (1994)
- Suite et fin, for clarinet, violin, cello, and piano (2000)
- Adlib for orchestra (2001–2002)
- Renseignements sur Apollon IV, for two pianos (2002)
