= Gérard Mentor Laurent =

Haitian historian and educator

Gérard Mentor Laurent (ca. 1933 – 9 April 2001) was a Haitian historian and educator. Some of his most notable works are Coup d'Oeil sur la Politique de Toussaint Louverture (1945), Six Etudes sur J. J. Dessalines (1951), Pages d'Histoire d'Haïti (1960), Le Commissaire Sonthonax à Saint-Domingue (4 volumes, 1965–1974), and Haiti et l'Indépendance Américaine (1976).
