= Who's Who in France =

Biographical dictionary

Who's Who in France is a biographical dictionary published in France and written in French.

In France it is simply "le Who's Who".

== History ==
The first edition of Who's Who in France was published in 1953 by Jacques Lafitte.

In 1974, Marie-Thérèse Lafitte succeeded her husband after his death.

In 1984 the company was bought by Antoine Hébrard.

At the beginning of the new millennium, a special book was written by Béatrice and Michel Wattel about the deceased people who were in Who's Who in France during their lifetime. The second edition (2005, printed in 2004) is published with the title Qui était qui, XXe siècle (Who was Who, Twentieth Century).

The first photographs (in black and white) appeared (after about 50 years) on paper in the 36th edition for 2005, printed in 2004.

In 2011, Charles de Saint Sauveur revealed in Le Parisien a problem for Who's Who in France about the exact year of birth of the actress Arielle Dombasle.

In April 2013, it was noticed that Who's Who in France wrote falsely that Gilles Bernheim (Chief Rabbi of France) was an "agrégé de philosophie".

== Sources ==
- Barbara E. Kemp and Robert L. Wick, § 70 "Who's Who in France. Qui est qui en France: Dictionnaire biographique", pages 32–33 in Robert L. Wick and Terry Ann Mood (editors), ARBA Guide to Biographical Resources 1986-1997, Libraries Unlimited Inc, 1998, 604 pages, ISBN 1-56308-453-8 .
- (in French) http://www.linternaute.com/actualite/savoir/06/whoswho/fabrication.shtml (2007 ?)
- (in French) Maud Descamps, http://www.europe1.fr/France/Who-s-who-VS-Wikipedia-293911/ « Who's who VS Wikipedia » on europe1.fr, 21 October 2010.
- (in French) Charles de Saint Sauveur, « Le Who's Who, de A à Z » et « Tony parker y entre », page 34 in Le Parisien (on paper) n° 20871, Friday 21 October 2011. Partly on line in http://legrandmorning.rtl2.fr/2011/10/le-whos-who-de-a-%C3%A0-z.html .
