= Gérard Vergnaud =

French mathematician (1933–2021)

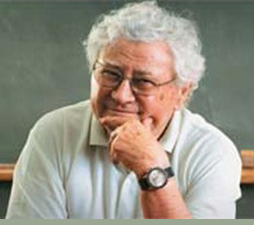
- Born: 8 February 1933; Doué-la-Fontaine, France
- Died: 6 June 2021 (aged 88); France
- Education: HEC Paris; University of Geneva
- Occupations: Mathematician; Philosopher; Psychologist
- Website: https://www.gerard-vergnaud.org

Gérard Vergnaud (8 February 1933 – 6 June 2021) was a French mathematician, philosopher, educator, and psychologist. He earned his doctorate from the International Center for Genetic Epistemology in Geneva under the supervision of Jean Piaget. Vergnaud was a professor emeritus of the Centre national de la recherche scientifique in Paris, where he was a researcher in mathematics. Among his most significant work has been the development of the Theory of Conceptual Fields, which describes how children develop an understanding of mathematics.

Gérard Vergnaud graduated from HEC Paris in 1956 and from the University of Geneva in 1968.
