= Gerard (surname) =

Gerard is a surname, and may refer to:

- Alexander Gerard (1728–1795), Scottish church minister and academic
- Alexander Gerard (explorer) (1792–1839), Scottish army officer and Himalayan explorer
- A. E. Gerard (Alfred Edward Gerard) (1877–1950), founder of several South Australian electrical businesses
- Alice Gerard, American journalist and peace activist
- Alphonso Gerard (1916–2002), American baseball player
- Andrew Gerard (died 1767), Scottish Episcopal minister and Bishop of Aberdeen
- Andrés Gerard Sr. (1924–2012), Mexican competitive sailor
- Andrés Gerard Jr., (born 1949), Mexican competitive sailor
- Antoinette Gérard (1909–1958), French writer and resistance fighter
- Bob Gerard (1914–1990), English racing driver and businessman
- Caitlin Gerard (born 1988), American actress and filmmaker
- Carl Gerard (1885–1966), Danish-American actor
- Charles Gerard (politician) (1657 – by 1701), English Member of Parliament
- Charles Gerard, 1st Earl of Macclesfield (c.1618–1694), English soldier and courtier
- Charles Gerard, 2nd Earl of Macclesfield (c.1659– 1701), English soldier and Member of Parliament
- Cindy Gerard, American novelist
- Claire Gérard (1889–1971), Belgian actress
- Danny Gerard (born 1977), American actor and musician
- Darren Gerard (born 1984), English cricketer
- Dave Gerard (cartoonist) (1909–2003), American cartoonist
- Dave Gerard (baseball) (1936–2001), American baseball player
- David Gerard (author) (born 1966/67), Australian-British author
- Don Gerard (born 1965), American musician and politician from Illinois
- Dorothea Gerard (1855–1915), Scottish novelist
- Eddie Gerard (1890–1937), Canadian ice hockey player, coach and manager
- Emily Gerard (1849–1905), Scottish author
- Esteban Gerard (born 1953), Mexican competitive sailor
- Éva Novák-Gerard (1930–2005), Hungarian swimmer
- Fitton Gerard, 3rd Earl of Macclesfield (1663–1702), English peer
- Sir Francis Gerard, 2nd Baronet (1617–1680), English politician
- Fred Gerard (1829–1913), American frontiersman, army scout and interpreter
- Fred Gerard (trumpeter) (1924–2012), French jazz trumpeter, composer and writer
- Geoff Gerard (born 1955), Australian rugby league footballer
- Geoff Gerard (politician) (1904–1997), New Zealand politician
- Gerry Gerard (1903–1951), American basketball and soccer coach
- Gil Gerard (1943–2025), American actor
- Gilbert Gerard of Crewood (1604–1673), Parliamentary army officer of the English Civil War
- Gilbert Gerard (died 1683), English lawyer and politician
- Gilbert Gerard (Governor of Worcester) (died 1646), Royalist officer of the English Civil War
- Gilbert Gerard (judge) (died 1593), English lawyer and judge
- Gilbert Gerard (MP for City of Chester) (fl.1575–1609), English Member of Parliament
- Gilbert Gerard (theological writer) (1760–1815), Scottish writer
- Sir Gilbert Gerard, 1st Baronet of Fiskerton (c.1632–1687), English soldier and politician
- Sir Gilbert Gerard, 1st Baronet of Harrow on the Hill (1587–1670), English politician
- Gus Gerard (born 1953), American basketball player
- Ian Gerard, American fashion event executive
- Jack N. Gerard (born 1957), American LDS Church leader
- James Gerard (clergyman) (c.1740–1789), English cleric and college head
- James Gilbert Gerard (1795–1835), Scottish surgeon and explorer
- James W. Gerard (1867–1951), American lawyer, diplomat and judge
- James W. Gerard Jr. (1823–1900), American politician from New York
- Jean Broward Shevlin Gerard (1938–1996), American diplomat
- Jim Gerard (born 1936), New Zealand politician
- John Gerard (1545–1612), English botanist
- John Gerard (Jesuit) (died 1637), English Catholic priest
- John Gerard (Royalist) (1632–1654), conspirator of the English Civil War
- John Gerard-Pearse (1924–2017), Royal Navy officer
- K. J. Gerard (born 1986), American football player
- Larry Gerard, American artistic gymnast
- Leo Gerard (1947–2025), Canadian steelworker and labour union leader
- Marcos Gerard (born 1950), Mexican competitive sailor
- Mark Gerard (1934–2011), American equine veterinarian
- Michael St. Gerard (born 1961), American actor
- Miles Gerard (c.1550–1590), English Catholic priest and martyr
- Ned Gerard (born 1956), competitive sharpshooter from the United States Virgin Islands
- Patricia Gerard, American politician from Florida
- Patrick Gerard (1794–1848), Scottish writer
- Paula Gerard (1907–1991), American visual artist
- Peter Gerard, American film director, producer and distributor
- Ralph W. Gerard (Ralph Waldo Gerard) (1900–1974), American neurophysiologist
- Ratcliffe Gerard (c.1584 – in or before 1670), English landowner and Royalist soldier
- Red Gerard (born 2000), American snowboarder
- Richard Gerard of Hilderstone (1635–1680), English landowner
- Richard Geoffrey Gerard (1904–1997), New Zealand politician
- Robert Gerard (born 1944), South Australian businessman
- Robert Gerard (footballer) (1920–2010), Belgian footballer
- Ron Gerard, American bridge player
- Ryan Gerard (born 1999), American golfer
- Sarah Gerard, American writer
- Sina Gerard or Gérard (born 1963), Rwandan entrepreneur
- Sumner Gerard (1916–2005), American businessman and politician from Montana
- Susan Gerard (born 1950), American politician from Arizona
- Teddie Gerard (1890–1942), Argentine film actress and entertainer
- Thomas Gerard (colonist) (1608–1673), Maryland colonist
- Thomas Gerard (historian) (1593-1634), of Trent, historian of Dorset
- Thomas Gerard (MP for Lancashire) (died 1416), represented Lancashire
- Thomas Gerard (reformer) (died 1540), English Protestant
- Thomas Gerard, 1st Baron Gerard (c.1564–1618), English landowner and politician
- Thomas Gerard, 1st Baron Gerard (died 1618), English politician and peer
- Sir Thomas Gerard, 1st Baronet (1560–1621), English politician
- Sir Thomas Gerard, 2nd Baronet (c.1584–1630), English landowner and politician
- Tieghan Gerard (born 1993), American food blogger and influencer
- Vin Gerard (born 1986), American wrestler
- Vincent Gerard (bishop) (1898–1984), Anglican bishop
- William Gerard (1518–1581), English statesman
- William Gerard (died 1584) (after 1520 – 1584), English Member of Parliament
- William Gerard (died 1609) (c.1551–1609), English politician
- William Gerard, 2nd Baron Gerard (1851–1902), British Army officer

== See also ==
- Gerrard (surname)
- Gérard (surname)
