= Gerrard (surname) =

Gerrard is a surname, and may refer to:

- Alex Gerrard (rugby league) (born 1991), English rugby league footballer
- Alice Gerrard (born 1934), American bluegrass musician and writer
- Alfred Horace Gerrard (1899–1998), English sculptor
- Anthony Gerrard (born 1986), English footballer
- Arthur Gerrard (1886–1977), Australian rules footballer
- Ben Gerrard, Australian actor
- Charles K. Gerrard (1883–1969), Irish-American film actor
- Corey Gerrard (born 1985), Australian golfer
- David Gerrard (born 1945), New Zealand swimmer and sports administrator
- David Gerrard (priest) (born 1939), English Anglican priest
- Denis Gerrard (1903–1965), British lawyer and judge
- Donny Gerrard (1946–2022), Canadian singer
- Douglas Gerrard (1891–1950), Irish-American actor and film director, elder brother of Charles K. Gerrard
- Edward Gerrard (footballer) (1900–1987), English footballer
- Eugene Gerrard (1881–1963), British officer of the Royal Marines and Royal Air Force
- Gene Gerrard (1892–1971), English actor
- Henry W. Gerrard (1899–1934), British cinematographer
- Jack Gerrard (born 1994), Australian swimmer
- James Joseph Gerrard, (1897–1991), American Catholic bishop
- John Gerrard (artist) (born 1974), Irish artist
- John Gerrard (doctor), Australian public health doctor
- John Gerrard (police officer) (1920–2003), London Metropolitan Police officer
- John M. Gerrard (born 1953), American judge from Nebraska
- Jon Gerrard (born 1947), Canadian politician from Manitoba
- Juliet Gerrard (born 1967), New Zealand biochemist and academic
- Kaff Gerrard (1894–1970), British painter and potter
- Lew Gerrard (born 1938), New Zealand tennis player
- Liam Gerrard, British-Irish actor
- Lisa Gerrard (born 1961), Australian singer and composer
- Marguerite Primrose Gerrard (1922–1993), Jamaican-born American artist
- Mark Gerrard (born 1982), Australian rugby union footballer
- Martin Gerrard (born 1967), English cricketer
- Matthew Gerrard, Canadian record producer and songwriter
- Michael Gerrard, American legal scholar
- Mo'onia Gerrard (born 1980), Australian netball player
- Neil Gerrard (born 1942), British politician
- Paul Gerrard (born 1973), English football goalkeeper and coach
- Paul Gerrard (artist), British concept designer
- Peter Gerrard, New Zealand association football player
- Ronald Gerrard (1912–1943), English rugby union footballer
- Roy Gerrard (1935–1997), English author and illustrator
- Samuel Gerrard (1767–1857), Canadian fur trader and politician
- Shawn Gerrard, Canadian film and television director
- Sophie Gerrard (born 1978), Scottish photographer
- Steven Gerrard (born 1980), English football player and manager
- Thomas Gerrard (died 1540), English Protestant reformer
- Thomas Gerrard (RAF officer) (1897–1923), British World War I flying ace
- Thomas John Gerrard (1871–1916), English Catholic priest and author
- William Tyrer Gerrard (1831–1866), English botanist and plant collector

== See also ==
- Jerrard
- Gerard (surname)
- Garrard (surname)
