= Gérard (surname) =

Gérard is a surname, and may refer to:

- Abdelrafik Gérard (born 1993), French footballer
- Adolphe Gérard (1844–1900), French chef
- Albert S. Gérard (1920–1996) was a Belgian scholar of comparative literature
- André Gérard (1911–1994, French footballer and football manager
- Andrés Gerard Jr. (born 1949), Mexican competitive sailor
- Angélique Gérard (born 1975), French business personality
- Antoine Gérard (born 1995), French Nordic skier
- Arnaud Gérard (born 1984), French road bicycle racer
- Augustin Gérard (1857–1926), French general
- Balthasar Gérard (c.1557–1584), French assassin of William I of Orange
- Bernard Gérard (composer) (1930–2000), French composer
- Bernard Gérard (intelligence officer), French intelligence officer
- Bernard Gérard (politician) (born 1953), French politician
- Charles Gérard (1922–2019), French actor and director
- Christopher Gérard (born 1962), Belgian writer and critic
- Claire Gérard (1889-1971), Belgian actress
- Danyel Gérard (born 1939), French pop singer and composer
- David Gérard (born 1977), French rugby union footballer
- Étienne Maurice Gérard (1773–1852), French Napoleonic military officer and statesman
- Félicie Gérard (born 1974), French politician
- Fernand-Marie-Eugène Le Gout-Gérard (1856–1924), French painter
- François Gérard (1770–1837), French painter
- Frédéric Gérard (1806–1857), French botanist and evolutionary thinker
- Jacques Gérard (1890–1918), French pilot and World War I flying ace
- Jean-Claude Gérard (born 1944), French flautist
- Jean Ignace Isidore Gérard (1803–1847), French illustrator and caricaturist
- Joachim Gérard (born 1988), Belgian wheelchair tennis player
- Joseph Gérard (1831–1914), French Catholic missionary
- Joseph Matthias Gérard de Rayneval (1736–1812), French diplomat and government minister
- Jules Gérard, French footballer
- Léon-Clément Gérard (1810–1876), French Catholic canon and author
- Louis Gérard (racing driver) (1899–2000), French racing driver
- Lucy Gérard (1872–1941), French actress
- Marguerite Gérard (1761–1837), French painter and etcher
- Méline Gérard (born 1990), French f footballer
- Mobanza Mobembo Gérard (born c.1985), known as Guyvanho, convicted Congolese poacher and ivory trader
- Raphaël Gérard (1968–2026), French politician
- René Gérard (footballer), French footballer
- René Gérard (cyclist), French racing cyclist
- René Gérard (propagandist) (fl.1942), French antisemitic propagandist
- Rosemonde Gérard (1871–1953), French poet and playwright
- Vincent Gérard (born 1986), French handball player
- Yves Gérard (1932–2020), French musicologist

== See also ==
- Gerard (surname)
