= Garrard (surname) =

Garrard is a surname. Notable people with the surname include:

- Apsley Cherry-Garrard (1886–1959), English explorer of Antarctica
- Bill Garrard (1940–2022), Republican politician from Oregon
- Charles Garrard (1868–1930), New Zealand cricketer and schoolteacher
- Charles Drake Garrard (c. 1755–1817), English land owner and politician
- David Garrard (born 1978), American football quarterback
- Sir David Garrard (1939–2025), English property developer
- Graeme Garrard (born 1965), Canadian professor at Cardiff University
- Jacob Garrard (1846–1931), Australian politician
- James Garrard (1749–1822), Governor of Kentucky
- Kenner Garrard (1827–1879), American Civil War general
- Lewis Hector Garrard (1829–1887), American travel writer
- Luke Garrard (born 1985), English soccer player and manager
- Mary Garrard (born 1937), American art historian at American University
- Raoul Garrard (1897–1977), New Zealand cricketer
- Theophilus T. Garrard (1812–1902), American Civil War general
- William Garrard (disambiguation), various people

- Sir William Garrard (1507–1571), English merchant and Lord Mayor of London
- William Garrard (died 1545), MP for New Romney (UK Parliament constituency)
- William George Garrard (1864–1944), New Zealand rugby union player and official

- Wilson Garrard (1899–1956), New Zealand cricketer and lawyer

== See also ==
- Garrard & Blumfield electric car makers 1894–1896
- Garrard & Co (founded 1742) English jewellers
- Garrard (automobile) (1904) built by Charles R. Garrard (1855–1955)
- Garrard Engineering and Manufacturing Company, audio equipment
- Garrard Conley, American author and LGBTQ activist
