= Gilbert Gerard =

Gilbert Gerard may refer to:

- Sir Gilbert Gerard (judge) (died 1593), English lawyer, politician, and landowner
- Gilbert Gerard (MP for City of Chester) (died 1609), English politician
- Gilbert Gerard, 2nd Baron Gerard (died 1622), Baron of Gerards Bromley, England
- Sir Gilbert Gerard (Governor of Worcester) (died 1646), Royalist colonel during the English Civil War
- Sir Gilbert Gerard, 1st Baronet of Harrow on the Hill (1587–1670), English politician
- Gilbert Gerard of Crewood (1604–1673), Parliamentary colonel during the First English Civil War
- Sir Gilbert Gerard (died 1683) English lawyer and politician
- Sir Gilbert Gerard, 1st Baronet of Fiskerton (died 1687), English politician and Royalist captain
- Gilbert Gerard (theological writer) (1760–1815), Moderator of the General Assembly of the Church of Scotland, 1803
- Gil Gerard (Gilbert C. Gerard, born 1943), American actor
