= Sailing at the 1968 Summer Olympics – Star =

Sailing at the Olympics

Star at the Games of the XIX Olympiad
- Venue: Acapulco
- Dates: 14–21 October
- Competitors: 40 from 20 nations
- Teams: 20

Medalists
1st place, gold medalist(s)		Lowell North; Peter Barrett	United States
2nd place, silver medalist(s)		Peder Lunde Jr. Per Wiken	Norway
3rd place, bronze medalist(s)		Franco Cavallo; Camillo Gargano	Italy

The Star was a sailing event on the Sailing at the 1968 Summer Olympics program in Acapulco. Seven races were scheduled. 40 sailors, on 20 boats, from 20 nations competed.

== Results ==
Rank	Helmsman (Country)	Crew	Sail No.	Race I		Race II		Race III		Race IV		Race V		Race VI		Race VII		Total Points	Total -1
Rank	Helmsman (Country)	Crew	Sail No.	Rank	Points	Rank	Points	Rank	Points	Rank	Points	Rank	Points	Rank	Points	Rank	Points	Total Points	Total -1
1st place, gold medalist(s)	Lowell North (USA)	Peter Barrett	US	1	0	3	5.7	3	5.7	1	0	2	3	~~12~~	~~18~~	1	0	32.4	14.4
2nd place, silver medalist(s)	Peder Lunde Jr. (NOR)	Per Wiken	N	2	3	1	0	6	11.7	~~11~~	~~17~~	7	13	7	13	2	3	60.7	43.7
3rd place, bronze medalist(s)	Franco Cavallo (ITA)	Camillo Gargano	I	~~9~~	~~15~~	2	3	4	8	8	14	1	0	4	8	6	11.7	59.7	44.7
4	Paul Elvstrøm (DEN)	Poul Mik-Meyer	D	3	5.7	6	11.7	~~10~~	~~16~~	7	13	5	10	1	0	5	10	66.4	50.4
5	Durward Knowles (BAH)	Percival Knowles	BA	6	11.7	~~DNS~~	~~26~~	2	3	3	5.7	4	8	9	15	14	20	89.4	63.4
6	David Forbes (AUS)	Richard Williamson	KA	4	8	7	13	5	10	12	18	~~DNF~~	~~26~~	6	11.7	4	8	94.7	68.7
7	Erik Schmidt (BRA)	Axel Schmidt	BL	~~18~~	~~24~~	8	14	17	23	17	23	3	5.7	2	3	3	5.7	98.4	74.4
8	Edwin Bernet (SUI)	Rolf Amrein	Z	10	16	4	8	1	0	10	16	~~13~~	~~19~~	11	17	12	18	94	75
9	John Albrechtson (SWE)	Ulf Norrman	S	5	10	5	10	11	17	4	8	~~DSQ~~	~~28~~	13	19	7	13	105	77
10	Stuart Jardine (GBR)	James Ramus	K	12	18	11	17	8	14	2	3	9	15	14	20	~~16~~	~~22~~	109	87
11	Peter Tallberg (FIN)	Henrik Tallberg	L	7	13	9	15	9	15	~~19~~	~~25~~	6	11.7	15	21	9	15	115.7	90.7
12	Eckart Wagner (FRG)	Fritz Kopperschmidt	G	8	14	12	18	~~DNF~~	~~26~~	9	15	8	14	10	16	13	19	122	96
13	Kálmán Tolnai (HUN)	László Farkas	M	17	23	16	22	7	13	5	10	17	23	3	5.7	~~DNF~~	~~26~~	122.7	96.7
14	Hartmann Bogumil (GDR)	Udo Springsklee	GO	16	22	15	21	12	18	6	11.7	11	17	~~17~~	~~23~~	11	17	129.7	106.7
15	Bruce Kirby (CAN)	Oswald Blouin	KC	14	20	~~18~~	~~24~~	14	20	15	21	16	22	5	10	8	14	131	107
16	Timir Pinegin (URS)	Fyodor Shutkov	SR	11	17	10	16	16	22	14	20	10	16	~~DNF~~	~~26~~	DNF	26	143	117
17	Mário Gentil Quina (POR)	José Gentil Quina	P	13	19	13	19	15	21	13	19	12	18	~~18~~	~~24~~	17	23	143	119
18	Juan Manuel Alonso-Allende (ESP)	Juan Alonso Aznar	E	DNF	26	DNF	25	13	19	20	26	~~DSQ~~	~~28~~	8	14	10	16	154	126
19	Andrés Gerard Jr. (MEX)	Marcos Gerard	MX	~~19~~	~~25~~	17	23	18	24	16	22	15	21	16	22	15	21	158	133
20	Roberto Sieburger (ARG)	Jorge Vago	A	15	21	14	20	19	25	18	24	14	20	19	25	~~DNF~~	~~26~~	161	135

DNF = Did not finish, DNS= Did not start, DSQ = Disqualified
= Male, = Female

=== Daily standings ===
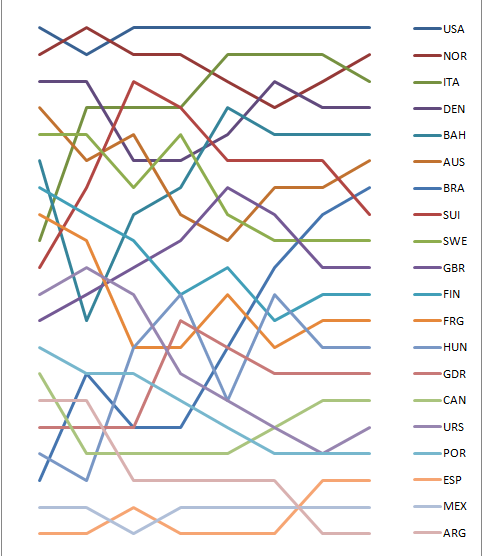
Graph showing the daily standings in the Star during the 1968 Summer Olympics

== Conditions at Acapulco ==
Of the total of three race areas were needed during the Olympics in Acapulco. Each of the classes was new Olympic scoring system.

Date	Race	Weather	Temperature (Celsius)	Wind direction (deg)	Wind speed (kn)	Sea	Current (kn-deg)
14 October 1968	I	Fair	34	305	15	Calm	0.5-120
15 October 1968	II	Fair	30	280	17	Calm	0.75-175
16 October 1968	III	Fair	34	265	11	Calm	0.75-135
17 October 1968	IV	Fair	29.5	200	6	Calm	0.5-115
19 October 1968	V	Normal	29.8	160	12	Calm	0.6-60
20 October 1968	VI	Fair	30	240	8	Calm	0.7-340
21 October 1968	VII	Cloudy	28.5	280	13	Choppy	0.6-135
