= Steve Stanton (disambiguation) =

Steve Stanton (born 1956) is a Canadian author, editor, and publisher.

Steve Stanton may also refer to:

- Susan Stanton (born 1959), city manager, born Steven Stanton
- Stephen Stanton (born 1961), American voice actor
