= Thomas Gerrard (disambiguation) =

Thomas Gerrard (died 1540) was an English Protestant martyr.

Thomas Gerrard may also refer to:

- Thomas John Gerrard (1871–1916), English priest
- Thomas Gerrard (RAF officer) (1897–1923), British World War I flying ace

== See also ==
- Thomas Gerard (disambiguation)
