= László Farkas =

László Farkas may refer to:

- László Farkas (biathlete) (born 1960), Hungarian Olympics biathlete
- László Farkas (sailor) (born 1941), Hungarian Olympic sailor
