= Edward Gerrard =

Edward Gerrard may refer to:

- Edward Gerrard (footballer), English footballer
- Edward Gerrard (taxidermist), founder of London taxidermy firm Edward Gerrard & Sons

== See also ==
- Eddie Gerard, Canadian ice hockey player, coach, and manager
