= Patrick Gerard =

Scortish writer (1794–1848)

- Born: 11 June 1794
- Died: 4 October 1848 (aged 54); Simla Indis
- Occupation: Writer

Patrick Gerard (11 June 1794 – 4 October 1848) was a Scottish writer. Pinus gerardiana is named after him.

== Biography ==
Gerard was the son of Gilbert Gerard, D.D., and brother of Alexander and of James Gilbert Gerard. He was born 11 June 1794. He probably entered the King's or Marischal College, Aberdeen, in 1808, and received a Bengal cadetship in 1812. He was appointed ensign in the 8th Bengal native infantry on 19 August 1812; became lieutenant therein on 16 December 1814, and brevet captain on 19 August 1827. He became captain in the 9th native infantry on 11 April 1828, and was placed on the invalid establishment in India on 8 August 1832. Most of his service was regimental, part of it attached to the hill corps, of which his brother James Gilbert was surgeon, the 1st Nusseerabad battalion. He died at Simla on 4 October 1848.

Gerard was author of ‘Observations on the Climate of Subathoo and Kotguhr’ in ‘Asiat. Res.’ xv. 469–88, meteorological observations made hourly for the space of nearly two years; of ‘Account of the Climate and Agriculture of Subathoo and Kotguhr’ in ‘Edinburgh Journal of Science’ (1828), ix. 233–41, cf. Froriep's ‘Notizen’ (1829), xxiii. cols. 65–71; and of ‘Remarks on some Mineral Products of the Himalayas’ in ‘Delhi Medical Journal’ (1844), i. 62–71. A joint paper by Alexander and Patrick, entitled ‘Account of a Journey through the Himalaya Mountains,’ appeared in ‘Edinburgh Philos. Journal’ (1824), x. 295–305. ‘A Journal of Meteorological Observations made in India from 1817 to 1829,’ by Patrick, forms British Museum Addit. MSS. 24017–22.
