= Richard Williamson (sailor) =

Australian sailor

Personal information
- Nationality: Australian
- Born: 31 October 1944 (age 81)

Sport
- Sport: Sailing

Richard Williamson (born 31 October 1944) is an Australian sailor. He competed in the Star event at the 1968 Summer Olympics.
