= Juan Alonso Aznar =

Spanish sailor

Personal information
- Nationality: Spanish
- Born: 30 July 1949 (age 75); Bilbao, Spain

Sport
- Sport: Sailing

Juan Alonso Aznar (born 30 July 1949) is a Spanish sailor. He competed in the Star event at the 1968 Summer Olympics.
