= List of mayors of Largo, Florida =

This is a list of mayors of Largo, Florida. Largo was incorporated as a town in 1905.

Term	Mayor	Notes
1905	M. Joel McMullen	
1907	Louis S. Johnson	
1909–1911	Seth Brown	
1911	John Stansel Taylor	
1911–1913	S. E. Smith	
1914	P. C. Kellar	
1914–1915	Turner A. Duren	
1915–1920	S. E. Smith	
1920–1921	B. H. Allen	
1921–1923	William F. Belcher	
1922	William A. Cameron	
1922	Ike M. Shriner	
1923–1924	Robert L. Youngblood	
1924–1925	Luther L. Wadford	
1925–1926	Louis S. Johnson	
1927–1935	William F. Belcher	
1935	William A. McMullen Jr.	
1935–1940	Elmer C. Carlson	
1940–1947	H. C. Robinson	
1947–1948	M. J. Lumsden	
1948–1949	Torben S. Madson	
1950	Richard M. Collins	
1951–1959	Donald R. Judkins	
1959	Douglas Cole	
1959–1969	Harry D. Powell	
1969–1973	Torben S. Madson	
1973–1979	Warren Andrews	
1979–1982	Thomas D. Feaster	
1982–1992	George C. McGough	
1993	Joseph Mangus	
1993–2000	Thomas D. Feaster	
2000–2006	Robert E. Jackson	
2006–2014	Patricia Gerard	First woman mayor.
2014–present	Woody Brown	Ran unopposed.

== See also ==
- Timeline of Largo, Florida history
