= Udo Springsklee =

German sailor

Personal information
- Nationality: German
- Born: 20 May 1939; Dresden, Germany
- Died: 17 September 1999 (aged 60); Potsdam, Germany

Sport
- Sport: Sailing

Udo Springsklee (20 May 1939 – 17 September 1999) was a German sailor. He competed in the Star event at the 1968 Summer Olympics.
