= Camillo Gargano =

Italian sailor

Personal information
- Born: 30 January 1942 Ferrara, Kingdom of Italy
- Died: 22 July 1999 (aged 57) Lille, France

Sailing career
- Sport: Sailing
Medal record
Men's sailing
Representing Italy
Olympic Games
Bronze medal – third place	1968 Mexico City	Star class

Camillo Gargano (30 January 1942 – 22 July 1999) was an Italian sailor. He won a bronze medal in the Star class at the 1968 Summer Olympics together with Franco Cavallo.
