= Franco Cavallo =

Italian sailor (1932–2022)

Personal information
- Born: 26 September 1932 Naples, Italy
- Died: 9 January 2022 (aged 89) Naples, Italy

Sailing career
- Sport: Sailing
Medal record
Sailing
Representing Italy
Olympic Games
Bronze medal – third place	1968 Mexico City	Star class

Franco Cavallo (26 September 1932 – 9 January 2022) was an Italian competitive sailor and Olympic medalist. He won a bronze medal in the Star class at the 1968 Summer Olympics in Mexico City in team with Camillo Gargano. Cavallo died in Naples on 9 January 2022, at the age of 89.
