= Thomas Gerard =

Thomas Gerard may refer to:

== Politicians ==
- Thomas Gerard (MP for Norwich) (fl. 1390) for Norwich
- Thomas Gerard (MP for Lancashire) (died 1416), represented Lancashire
- Thomas Gerard, 1st Baron Gerard (died 1618), English politician and peer
- Sir Thomas Gerard, 1st Baronet (1560–1621), English politician
- Sir Thomas Gerard, 2nd Baronet (1584–1630), English landowner and politician

== Others ==
- Thomas Gerard (reformer) (died 1540), English Protestant
- Thomas Gerard (historian) (1593-1634), of Trent, historian of Dorset
- Thomas Gerard (colonist) (1608–1673), Maryland colonist

== See also ==
- Thomas Gerrard (disambiguation)
