= Wilson Garrard =

New Zealand cricketer (1899–1956)

Personal information
- Full name: Wilson Roziere Garrard
- Born: 14 June 1899; Papanui, New Zealand
- Died: 2 June 1956 (aged 56); Auckland, New Zealand
- Batting: Right-handed
- Role: Wicket-keeper
- Relatives: Charles Garrard (father); Raoul Garrard (brother); William George Garrard (uncle)

Domestic team information
- Years: Team
- 1918/19–1924/25: Auckland

Career statistics
Competition	First-class
Matches	12
Runs scored	215
Batting average	11.94
100s/50s	0/0
Top score	44
Catches/stumpings	18/8
- Source: CricketArchive, 14 January 2015

Wilson Roziere Garrard (14 June 1899 – 2 June 1956) was a New Zealand cricketer who played first-class cricket for Auckland from 1919 to 1925 and represented New Zealand in the days before New Zealand played Test cricket.

== Cricket career ==
Wilson Garrard made his first-class debut as Auckland's wicket-keeper in 1918–19. For the next six seasons he and Richard Rowntree shared the wicket-keeping position for Auckland, as well as both playing for New Zealand.

He made his highest score of 44 for Auckland against Wellington in 1924–25. Rowntree was unavailable for New Zealand's two matches against the touring Victorians later that season, and Garrard was selected for the second match, replacing James Condliffe. It was his last first-class match.

Although Garrard was primarily a wicket-keeper, during a senior match for the University club in Auckland in March 1919, he bowled three overs—alternating between left and right arm deliveries. He bowled the first over with his left arm, the second with his right (his natural arm), and the third again with his left, taking a wicket in each over and conceding a total of 13 runs.

== Later life ==
Garrard gave up his first-class cricket career to concentrate on his law practice. In 1926 he moved to Rotorua and later to Cambridge in the Waikato. He represented Waikato against the touring Australians in 1927–28 and MCC in 1929–30.

In December 1928 Garrard married Molly Fortune in Rotorua. In 1938 he was elected to the Cambridge Borough Council.
