= Raoul Garrard =

New Zealand cricketer (1897–1977)

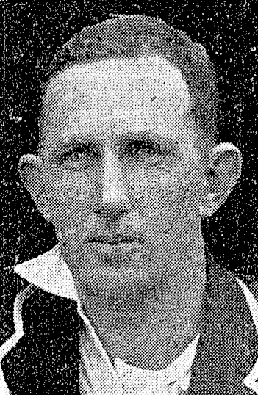

Personal information
- Full name: Derwent Raoul Garrard
- Born: 6 October 1897; Christchurch, New Zealand
- Died: 14 June 1977 (aged 79); Auckland, New Zealand
- Batting: Right-handed
- Bowling: Right-arm leg-spin
- Relatives: Charles Garrard (father); Wilson Garrard (brother); William George Garrard (uncle)

Domestic team information
- Years: Team
- 1917/18–1941/42: Auckland

Career statistics
Competition	First-class
Matches	32
Runs scored	960
Batting average	24.61
100s/50s	0/5
Top score	67 not out
Balls bowled	5,255
Wickets	92
Bowling average	25.63
5 wickets in innings	6
10 wickets in match	2
Best bowling	8/51
Catches/stumpings	18/–
- Source: CricketArchive, 14 January 2015

Derwent Raoul Garrard (6 October 1897 – 14 June 1977) was a New Zealand cricketer who played first-class cricket for Auckland from 1918 to 1942 and represented New Zealand in the days before New Zealand played Test cricket.

== Early life and career ==
Raoul Garrard was the elder son of Charles Garrard, a first-class cricketer and schoolteacher, and the brother of Wilson Garrard, who also played cricket for New Zealand. Raoul was a successful schoolboy cricketer in the Heathcote Williams Shield.

A leg-spinner who put "plenty of turn on the ball" and a useful lower-order batsman, Garrard made his first-class debut in 1917–18. In his third match, in 1918–19, he opened the bowling and took 6 for 143 and 5 for 84 in a high-scoring match against Wellington that Auckland won.

In 1921-22 he was the leading bowler in the Plunket Shield, with 23 wickets in three matches at an average of 10.34. He took 3 for 35 and 4 for 24 against Otago, 1 for 30 and 8 for 51 against Canterbury and 4 for 46 and 3 for 52 against Wellington. Auckland won all three matches, and the championship.

Garrard was selected to play for New Zealand in all three matches against MCC in 1922–23, but apart from top-scoring with 47 in the first innings of the first match he had little success with bat or ball.

== Later career ==
Garrard played little first-class cricket for the next nine seasons, concentrating on his career as an accountant. He had a practice in Auckland, also acting as a liquidator. He was honorary auditor to the Auckland Cricket Association. He married Edna McMaster in the Auckland suburb of Devonport in April 1927.

When he returned to Plunket Shield cricket in 1932–33 at the age of 35 he took 13 wickets at an average of 16.92 in three matches, including 5 for 69 and 5 for 83 (and scored 55 in the second innings) in the match against Wellington. But in the same match the 18-year-old Wellington leg-spinner Doug Freeman took 4 for 85 and 5 for 102, and when the Test team to play England was announced shortly afterwards, Freeman was preferred.

Garrard had another good season in 1933–34, taking 14 wickets in the Plunket Shield at 22.14 and making 154 runs at 51.33, including his highest score of 67 not out against Otago. Auckland won the Shield. He played a few more first-class matches before retiring.
