= Jorge Vago =

Argentine sailor

Personal information
- Born: 25 August 1927; Buenos Aires, Argentina
- Died: 2 March 2013 (aged 85)

Sport
- Sport: Sailing

Jorge Vago (25 August 1927 – 2 March 2013) was an Argentine sailor. He competed in the Star event at the 1968 Summer Olympics.
