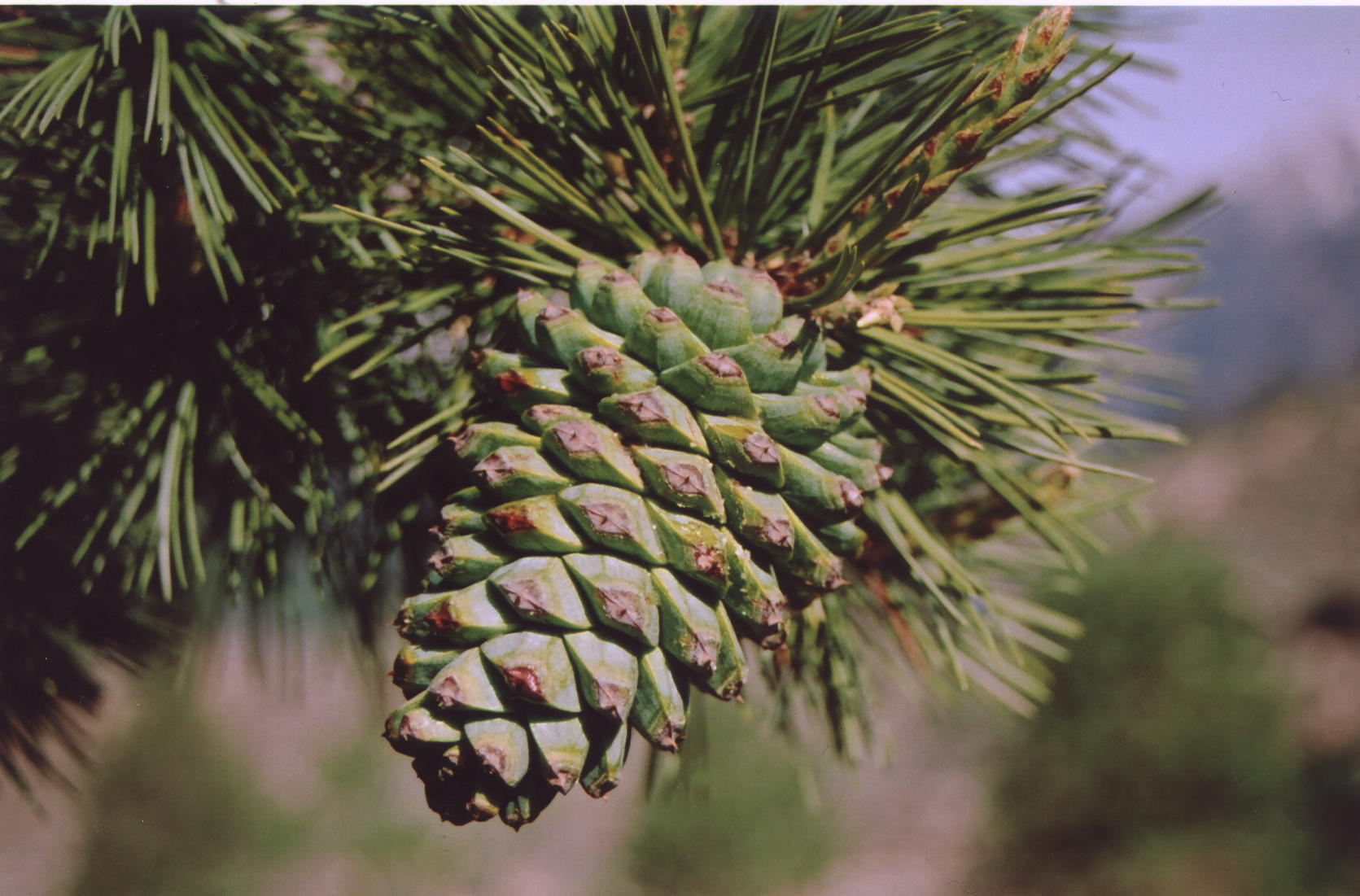
- Pinus gerardiana female cone

Conservation status
- Near Threatened (IUCN 3.1)

Scientific classification
- Kingdom: Plantae
- Clade: Tracheophytes
- Clade: Gymnospermae
- Division: Pinophyta
- Class: Pinopsida
- Order: Pinales
- Family: Pinaceae
- Genus: Pinus
- Subgenus: P. subg. Strobus
- Section: P. sect. Quinquefoliae
- Subsection: P. subsect. Gerardianae
- Species: P. gerardiana

Binomial name
- Pinus gerardiana Wall. ex D. Don

Synonyms
- Pinus aucklandii Lodd. ex Gordon & Glend. in Pinetum: 195 (1858), not validly publ.; Pinus chilghoza Knight in Syn. Conif. Pl.: 30 (1850), not validly publ.; Pinus gerardii J.Forbes in Hort. Woburn.: 210 (1833), orth. var.; Pinus neosa Gouan ex W.H.Baxter in J.C.Loudon, Hort. Brit., ed. 3: 658 (1839), not validly publ.

= Pinus gerardiana =

Chilgoza pine

Species of plant

Pinus gerardiana, commonly known as the chilghoza pine or neja, is a pine species native to parts of central and southern Asia, including the western Himalayas. The International Union for Conservation of Nature (IUCN) listed it as near threatened in 2011. The pine nuts are locally collected for consumption.

== Description ==
The trees are 15–25 metres (49–82 ft) tall with usually deep, wide and open crowns with long, erect branches. However, crowns are narrower and shallower in dense forests. The bark is very flaky, peeling to reveal light greyish-green patches. The branchlets are smooth and olive-green. The leaves are needle-like, in groups of three, 6–10 centimetres (2 1/2–4 in) long, and spread stiffly. They are glossy green on the outer surface, with blue-green stomatal lines on the inner face; their sheaths fall in the first year. The cones are 10–18 cm (4–7 in) long and 9–11 cm (3 1/2–4 1/2 in) wide when open, with wrinkled, reflexed apophyses and an umbo curved inward at the base. The seeds (pine nuts) are 17–23 millimetres (5/8–7/8 in) long and 5–7 mm (3/16–1/4 in) broad, with a thin shell and a rudimentary wing.

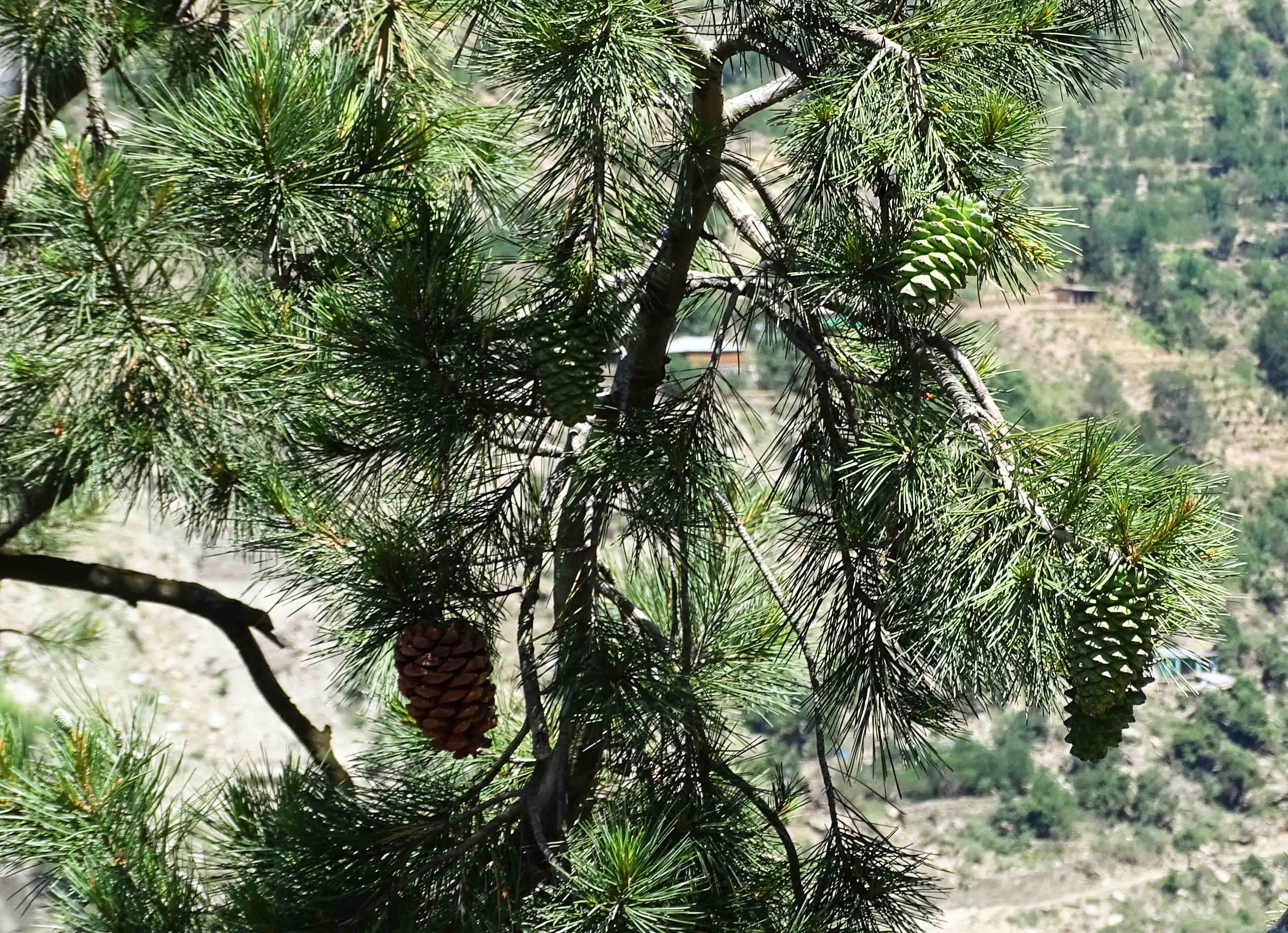
Cones and leaves

=== Similar species ===
P. gerardiana is similar to the closely related lacebark pine (Pinus bungeana), another pine with flaking bark. However, P. gerardiana has denser, longer, and more slender needles, as well as larger cones than P. bungeana.

== Taxonomy ==
The scientific name commemorates Captain Patrick Gerard, a British army officer of the Bengal Native Infantry. who collected it during a 1823–25 military survey in India.

It was first published in A.B.Lambert, Descr. Pinus, ed. 3, 2: 144 bis in 1832.

== Distribution and habitat ==
P. gerardiana is native to Afghanistan, Pakistan, India, and Tibet. It grows at elevations of 1,800–3,350 m (5,910–10,990 ft). It inhabits valley floors in the Himalayas, tending to grow among open vegetation on dry, sunny slopes.

== Ecology ==
It often occurs in association with Cedrus deodara, and Pinus wallichiana.

Since their seeds do not have a wing capable of enabling effective dispersal by wind, the seeds of P. gerardiana are dispersed by birds. The Eurasian nutcracker (Nucifraga caryocatactes subsp. multipunctata) is one such species that does so.

P. gerardiana is also a secondary host for Himalayan dwarf mistletoe.

== Conservation ==
In 2011, this species was listed as near threatened on the IUCN Red List of Threatened Species. It was previously listed as Lower Risk/near threatened in 1998. P. gerardina forests have declined by an estimated 30% due to conversion of pine forests to farmland, intensive grazing, and overharvesting of the seed cones and timber for firewood. The Himachal Pradesh State Forest Department has tried artificial regeneration of chilgoza pine at many places. However, performance of seedlings was found to be very poor.

== Uses ==
Older trees that do not produce enough cones to harvest pine nuts from are felled for firewood. The wood is also used for local light construction and carpentry.

=== Food ===
Chilghoza seeds, or pine nuts, are harvested for consumption in autumn and early winter by knocking the cones off of the trees. The trees and seed harvesting rights are owned by local mountain clans and villages in some areas, from which they may be exported to markets in the northern Indian plains. In traditional harvesting practices, enough seeds are left behind for the forest to regenerate, but in areas controlled by private contractors, all cones are harvested.

Chilgoza pine nuts are rich in carbohydrates and proteins. The seeds are locally referred to and marketed as "chilgoza", "neja" (singular) or "neje" (plural). Chilghoza is one of the most important cash crops of Afghanistan, as well as of Kinnaur and Pangi Valley of Chamba district of Himachal Pradesh, India. They are sold at approximately $20–$53 per kilograms in India.
