= William Garrard (disambiguation) =

William Garrard may refer to:

- William Garrard (b. 1518-d. 1571)
- William Garrard (died 1545), MP for New Romney (UK Parliament constituency)
- William George Garrard, rugby union player
- Bill Garrard, politician
