= Alice Gerard =

American journalist

Alice Gerard is an American journalist and peace activist who lives in Buffalo, New York.

== Work with School of the Americas Watch ==
After protesting at the School of the Americas in Fort Benning, Georgia in 2003 as part of a group from SOA Watch, Gerard was convicted of trespass. She was sentenced to three months in the federal prison camp in Danbury, Connecticut. She crossed the Fort Benning fence two more times (2004 and 2006). She served six-month sentences in the federal prison camp in Danbury in 2005 and in 2007. In addition to fence crossing, Gerard has also written articles about controversy surrounding Western Hemisphere Institute for Security Cooperation (the current name for School of the Americas) for Buffalo's Alt Press, including "Same Old, Same Old: Medieval Practices in a Modern Era", and she is a member of SOA Watch's Legislative Working Group.

== Other work ==
In 2008, she participated in a Witness Against War walk that was organized by Voices for Creative Nonviolence. The 500-mile walk began on July 12 in Chicago, Illinois, and ended on August 30, in Saint Paul, Minnesota. The group, which included a U.S. Army veteran who served in Iraq (and now a member of Iraq Veterans Against the War), Kathy Kelly (who had been in Iraq at the start of the war in 2003), and others, walked through the state of Wisconsin and gave presentations in various venues, including churches, libraries, and community centers. Their goal was to share the human cost of war through eyewitness accounts. The group also held a vigil at Fort McCoy, which was preparing to send the largest contingent of National Guard since World War II into active deployment in Iraq. In 2009, she participated with 49 others in a Walk for Peace from Camp Williams, Wisconsin, home of the US Property & Fiscal Office (USP&FO) for the State of Wisconsin, as well as the Army National Guard's Consolidated State Maintenance Facility to Fort McCoy, an active US military training center in Wisconsin. In the spring of 2010, she participated in a Walk for a Nuclear Free Future, from Salamanca to New York City.
