= Léon-Clément Gérard =

19th-century French-italian Roman Catholic clergyman and author

- Born: 18 March 1810; Cogne, Aoste, Doire, French Empire
- Died: 1 November 1876 (aged 66); Aosta, Duchy of Aosta, Italy
- Occupations: Cathedral canon Author-polemicist

Léon-Clément Gérard (18 March 1810 – 1 November 1876) was a churchman in the Aosta Valley who became a cathedral canon of the Aosta Cathedral. Within the church he came to prominence as a controversialist, notably on account of his long-standing record of theological and very public feuding with Félix Orsières to whose polemical Liberal Catholicism Gérard, alongside his colleagues within the Roman Catholic Diocese of Aosta, he was strongly opposed.

His church career culminated in his appointment as diocesan archpriest. It is, however, on account of his activities as a prolific writer, in particular of religious and regional publications, that he came to wider prominence.

In 1859/1860 the Aosta Valley became part of Italy. Despite an energetic campaign of population shifting and language suppression under Mussolini, the French language is nowadays official and very widely spoken in the Aosta Valley. In the nineteenth century the Valdôtain dialect dominated overwhelmingly. In his published output Gérard used French.

== Biography ==
Léon-Clément Gérard was born in Cogne, a small iron mining town in the mountains in Southern Aosta Valley. Jean-Joseph de Jean-Antoine Gaspard, his father, was an agricultural smallholder. His mother's birth name, Marie Buthier, indicates that she came from an established local family. Gérard studied for the priesthood and was ordained on 23 September 1833.

His first posting following ordination was as Vicar of Ayas between 1833 and 1835. That was followed by a longer incumbency, between 1835 and 1843, at the little spa resort of Saint-Vincent. He then undertook a curacy at La Salle between 1843 and 1856. Here he was able to consecrate the newly rebuilt little church on 17 August 1847. During his time at La Salle, on 4 July 1845 he was recruited as a member of the chapter at Aosta Cathedral undertaking both jobs simultaneously. On 22 January 1856 he was transferred from La Salle to Saint-Jean-Baptiste, a city-center parish for which the cathedral also serves as the parish church: here he held the curacy till his death some twenty years later. He was appointed deputy archpriest on 10 April 1856 and then diocesan archpriest on 4 January 1860.

== Polemicist and author ==
Gérard's first published works were poems included in "Feuille d'Annonces d'Aoste", the leading local newspaper before 1848. This involved working with the progressive canon Félix Orsières (among others). At the Feuille d'Annonces, Gérard and Orsières became two of the seven contributing poets identified collectively as the "Pléiade valdôtaine" (literally, "Pleiades of the Aosta Valley"). The 1848 Statute of [King] Charles Albert triggered a political change towards liberalism which was followed swiftly by a succession of upheavals in the newspaper industry. The catholic conservative "Indépendant" was launched on 1 March 1849, in part as a reaction to the more liberal tone being adopted by the existing mainstream regional media: Gérard he was one of those who switched from the Feuille d'Annonces, becoming instead a regular contributing editor to the new newspaper for the four years until 1853 when its "radical anticlericalism" led to its cessation. During 1850/51 Gérard emerged as the principal press interlocutor of the Bishop of Aosta, André Jourdain and of the more conservative among the regional churchmen more generally. This, along with aspects of his own views and temperament, set up a long-standing and increasingly intense hostile relations between Gérard and the progressive Canon Orsières with whom he had worked on the "Feuille d'Annonces d'Aoste". Their differences were played out in print and centred on the role of the church in society. The dispute came to an end only in 1855, when Orsières, threatened with excommunication, was persuaded to sign a retraction and agree to submit to the "holy congregation" - in effect a quasi-judicial tribunal of priests set up by the bishop, which had robustly rejected Orsières' position on a series of social and ecclesiastical matters on which Bishop Jourdain followed the robustly traditionalist views of the church under the leadership of the recently elected Pope Pius IX.

The twenty-first century commentators Joseph-Gabriel Rivolin and Omar Borettaz find Gérard's polemical approach and theology a little "old fashioned" ("...démodés"). Old-fashioned or not, according to the Aosta Valley scholar Abbé Henry, the surviving published legacy of Léon-Clément Gérard comprises more than 50,000 verses, which together constitute an important element in the Valdôtain literary heritage.

== Memberships ==
On 22 April 1856 Gérard became a member of the Saint-Anselme Academy.

== Output (selection) ==
=== Polemics attacking the reformer Canon Orsières ===
- Études critiques sur quelques articles de la Feuille d'annonces d'Aoste. - Imprimerie de Damien Lyboz, 1848.
- Le Misanthrope à nu, ou, Réfutation du tartuffe dévoilé A. Burdet, 1850
- Remède au poison, ou, Réfutation d'une petite brochure intitulée : Quelle doit être l'influence du clergé ?. - Lyboz, 1850.
- Le Prêtre contre l'évangile, ou, Cranmer devant Cromwell. Imprimerie d'Aimé Burdet, 1851.
- Réponse à l'opuscule le progrès d'Orsières, 1864.

=== On religious topics ===
- Le Guide du catholique, ou, Préservatif contre le protestantisme. Typographie Mensio, 1857
- Le Parfum de l'autel, ou, Recueil de poésies sacrées Imprimerie J.-B. Mensio, 1871
- Poésies en l'honneur de sa Sainteté Pie IX, Imprimerie J.-B. Mensio, 1871
- L'Imitation de Jésus-Christ Imprimerie de J.-B. Mensio, 1873
- Le Petit Catéchisme, ou, Méthode à suivre pour enseigner aux petits enfants
- Les Principaux Mystères de notre sainte religion . Imprimerie de J.-B. Mensio, 1873
- La Harpe sainte , Imprimerie de Jean-Baptiste Mensio, 1875
- Le Bon Ami des enfants, ou, Souvenir de la première communion Imprimerie Louis Mensio, 1879

=== Regionalist works ===
- La Vallée d'Aoste sur la scène Imprimerie Mensio, 1862, Éditions de la Vallée d'Aoste, 1926 réédition Librairie valdôtaine 1985
- Les Amours et les veillées parmi les habitants des campagnes . – Franco, traduction par Gérard Léon-Clément. -Imprimerie D. Lyboz, 1863
- Petite Anthologie valdôtaine, 1964

=== Translations into French verse ===
- Livre de Job 1851
- Discours sur la montagne 1852
- Divers cantiques de l'Écriture sainte 1853
- L'Imitation de Jésus-Christ 1853
- Livre de l'Ecclésiaste 1853
- Lamentations de Jérémie 1854
- La Christiade : poème du sauveur du monde de Marco Girolamo Vida, H. Goemaere, Bruxelles 1867 et Imprimerie J.-B. Mensio, Aoste 1876.

Gérard also authored several supposedly more light-hearted works such as "Le Nez de Farinet", "Mantellus" and a "Collection of songs, charades and epigrams".
