= Per Olav Wiken =

Norwegian sailor

Personal information
- Nationality: Norwegian
- Born: 23 March 1937 Oslo, Norway
- Died: 14 January 2011 (aged 73)
- Height: 183 cm (6 ft 0 in)
- Weight: 80 kg (176 lb)

Sport
- Sport: Sailing
Medal record
Representing Norway
Sailing
Olympic Games
| Silver medal – second place | 1968 Mexico City | Star class |

Per Olav Wiken (23 March 1937 – 14 January 2011) was a Norwegian sailor and Olympic medalist.

He received a silver medal in the Star class at the 1968 Summer Olympics in Mexico City, together with Peder Lunde Jr.
