= Jerrard =

Jerrard is a surname. Notable people with the surname include:

- Alan Jerrard (1897–1968), English recipient of the Victoria Cross
- George Jerrard (1804–1863), British mathematician
- Harold George Jerrard (1921–2013), Physicist and Mayor of Fareham
- John Alexander Jerrard, judge of the Supreme Court of Queensland
- Paul Jerrard, hockey player for the Minnesota North Stars
