= Lucy Gérard =

French actress (1872–1941)

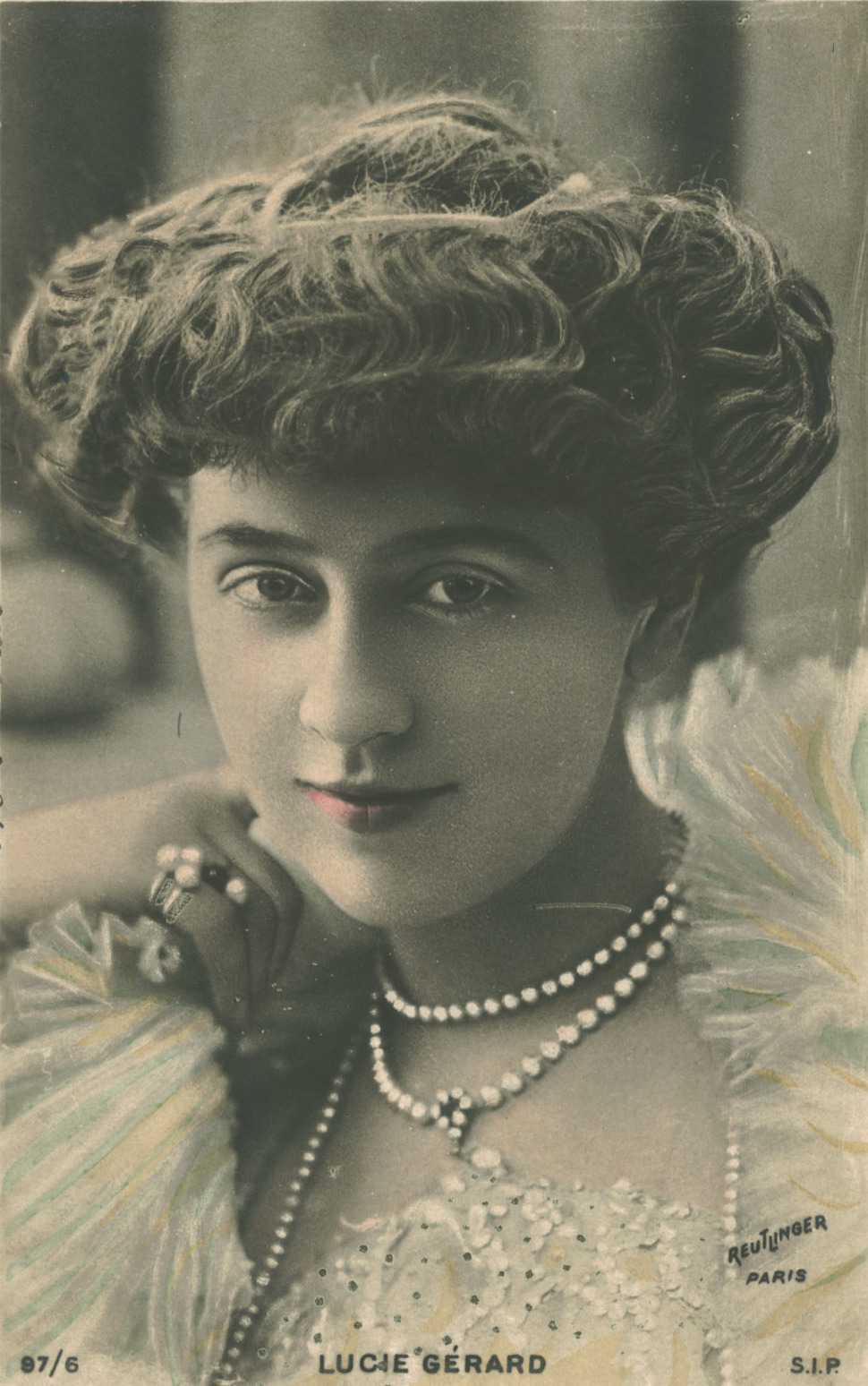
- Lucy Gérard, by Léopold-Émile Reutlinger
- Born: Marie-Louise Philiberte Lucy Gérard; 2 June 1872; Lyon, France
- Died: 20 November 1941; Paris, France
- Other names: Lucie Gérard, Lucy Mareil
- Occupation: Actress

Lucy Gérard (2 June 1872 – 20 November 1941), born Marie-Louise Philiberte Lucy Gérard, was a French actress on stage and in silent films; in her later career she was billed as Lucy Mareil.

== Early life ==
Lucy Gérard was born in Lyon, France, on 2 June 1872. She studied with François Jules Edmond Got at the Paris Conservatoire.

== Career ==
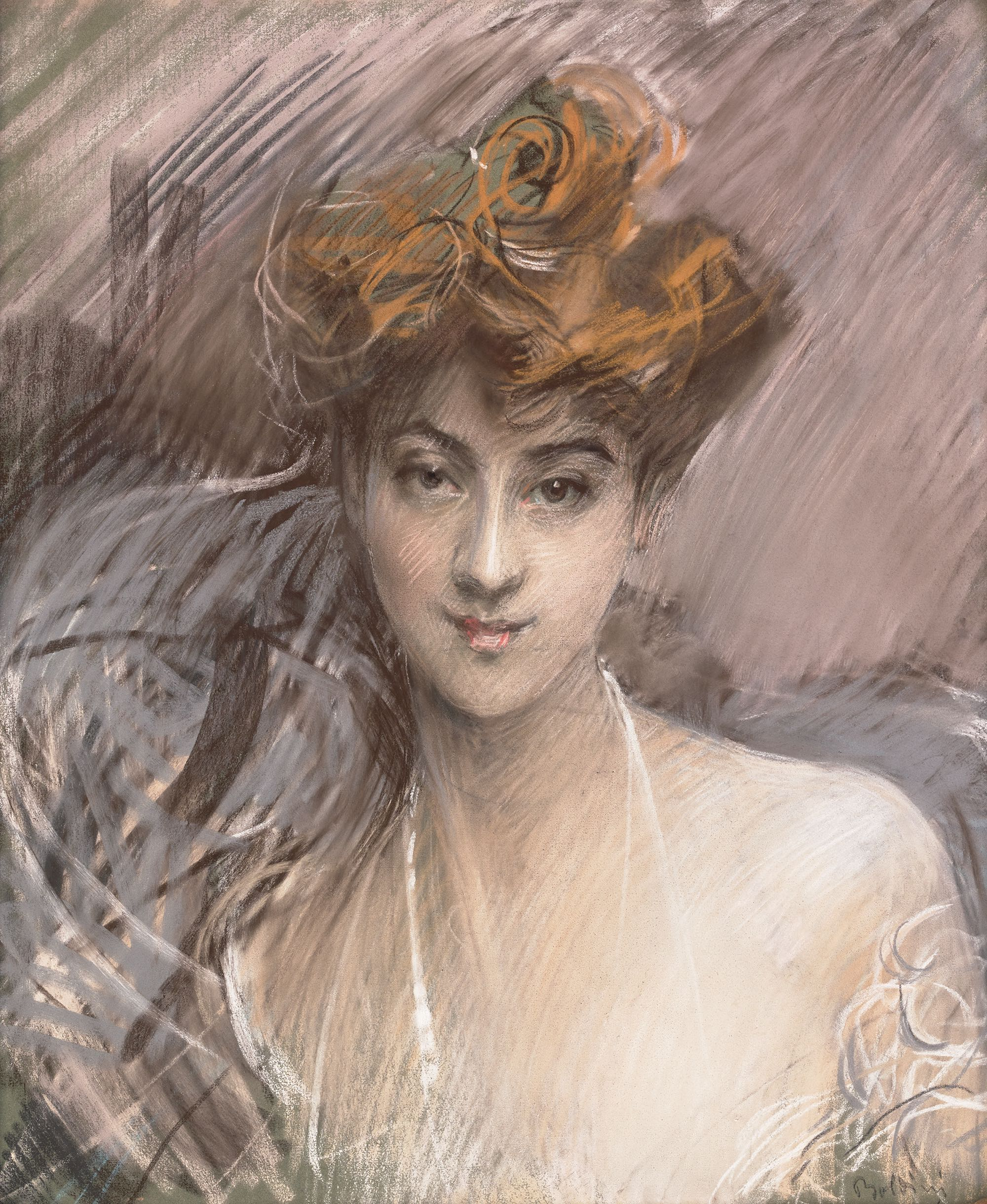
Lucy Gérard (c. 1890), pastel portrait by Giovanni Boldini

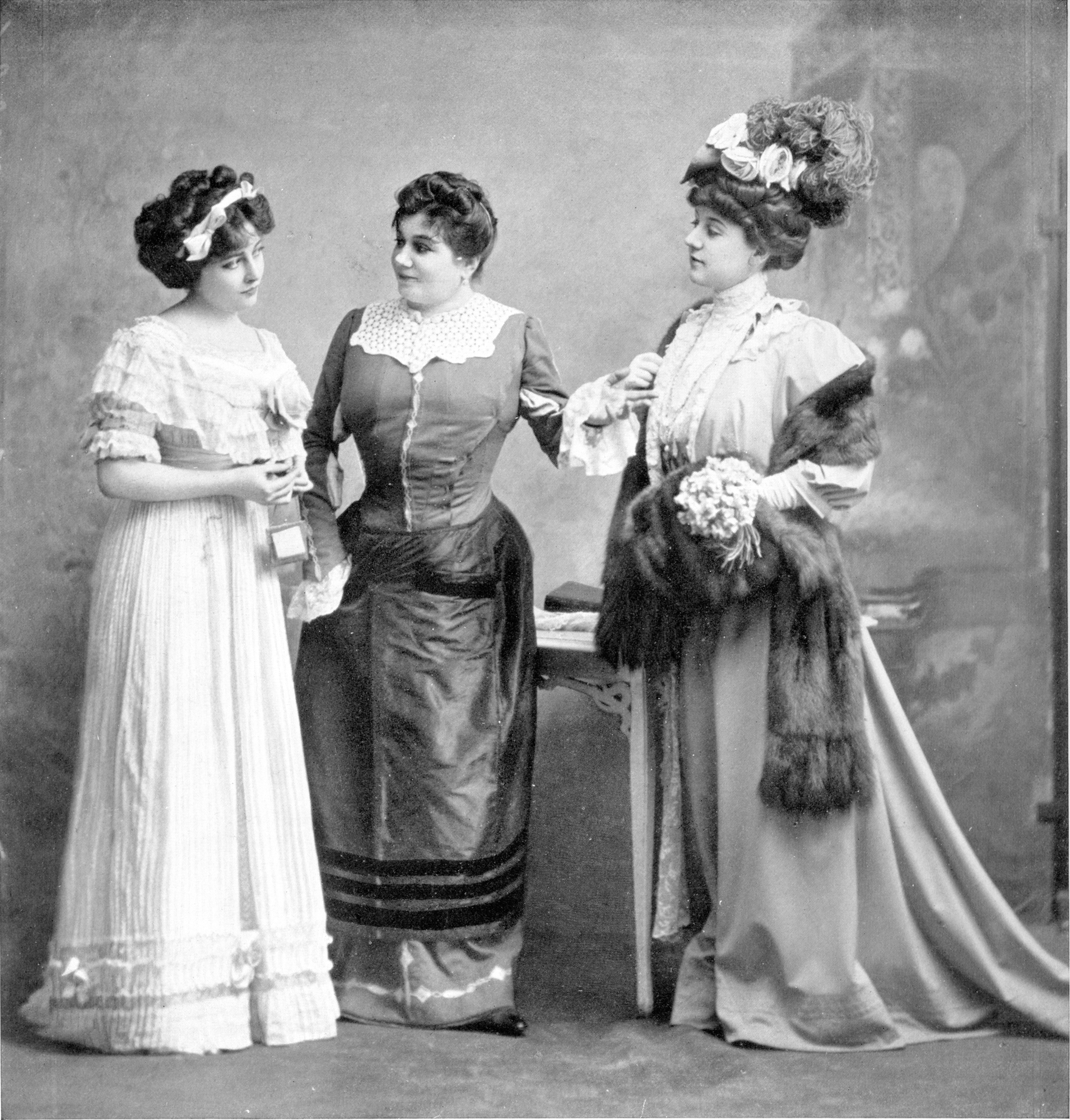
Geneviève Lantelme, Delphine Renot and Lucy Gérard, in Trait d'Union (1906)

Gérard began acting in her teens, with her Paris debut in 1888, in the opera Isoline. She was active on the Paris stage, including a role in La Montagne Enchantée (1897) with Jane Hading. She was a popular subject of souvenir postcards, cigarette cards, and cabinet cards, and Italian artist Giovanni Boldini made a pastel portrait of her.

As "Lucy Mareil", she appeared in at least a dozen French silent films, including Blessure d'amour (1916), C'est pour les orphelins! (1917), Les leçons de chant de Rigadin (1918), Madame et son filleul (1919), Chouquette et son as (1919), Les cinqs gentlemen maudits (1920), L'empereur des pauvres (1921), La flamme (1922), and Petit Ange et son pantin (1923).

== Personal life ==
Lucy Gérard died in Paris in 1941, aged 69 years.
