= Charles Garrard =

New Zealand cricket umpire and educator

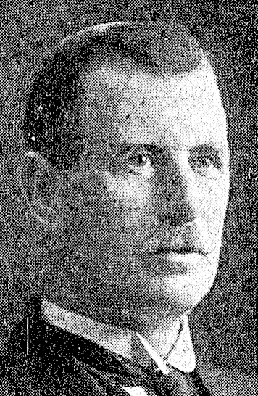

Personal information
- Full name: Charles Wilson Garrard
- Born: 9 October 1868; Nelson, New Zealand
- Died: 21 February 1930 (aged 61); Auckland, New Zealand
- Relatives: William George Garrard (brother); Raoul Garrard (son); Wilson Garrard (son)

Domestic team information
- Years: Team
- 1886-87 to 1904-05: Canterbury

Career statistics
Competition	First-class
Matches	13
Runs scored	326
Batting average	17.15
100s/50s	0/1
Top score	50*
Balls bowled	404
Wickets	2
Bowling average	81.50
5 wickets in innings	0
10 wickets in match	0
Best bowling	1/20
Catches/stumpings	4/0
- Source: Cricket Archive, 14 January 2015

Charles Wilson Garrard (9 October 1868 – 21 February 1930) was a New Zealand cricketer who played first-class cricket for Canterbury from 1887 to 1904. A school teacher, he became Senior Inspector of Schools for the Auckland district.

== Early life and cricket career ==
Garrard's family had settled in the Nelson district after moving from England. He was born in Nelson and educated at Christchurch Boys' High School, and joined the education department in 1883 as a pupil teacher. He obtained a BA degree from Canterbury College, and taught at Kaiapoi, then as headmaster at Papanui on the outskirts of Christchurch.

He played his first match for Canterbury in 1886–87, batting at number six and scoring 24 in a victory over Otago. He gained a regular spot in the team in 1897–98, when he made his highest score, 50 not out, which was the top score in Canterbury's second innings in their loss to Wellington. He played his last match for Canterbury in 1904–05.

Garrard also played Rugby for Canterbury, and served on the Canterbury selection committee in the 1890s.

== Later life and career ==
Garrard moved to Auckland in 1906, working as a staff inspector, and became the district's senior inspector in 1921. He initiated a system of communication between city schools and rural schools in order to enable rural teachers and students to keep up to date with educational developments.

He umpired four first-class cricket matches between 1901 and 1911. Later he was prominent in bowls in Auckland.

Garrard married Avis Todd in Kaiapoi in December 1893. They had a daughter and two sons, Raoul and Wilson, both of whom represented New Zealand at cricket. Charles died in February 1930, Avis in April 1951.
