= Marguerite Primrose Gerrard =

Botanical artist (1922–1993)

Marguerite Primrose Gerrard (29 July 1922, Jamaica – 11 August 1993, Delaware County, Pennsylvania, born Marguerite Primrose Tyndale-Biscoe, was a Jamaica-born American botanical artist.

== Life and family ==
Marguerite Primrose Tyndale-Biscoe was born in Jamaica on 29 July 1922 in a family of Robert Stafford Tyndale-Biscoe and Marguerite Eliza Wilson. In 1948 she married James Herbert Gerrard, taking Gerrard as her married name. They had a son, James Herbert Gerrard the Younger (1954-1982). Gerrard died on 11 August 1993 and is buried in the United States at Arlington Cemetery in Drexel Hill, Pennsylvania.

== Art ==
Marguerite Primrose Gerrard worked in techniques of botanical watercolour, tempera, and gouache. Her botanical watercolours and drawings are included to the Catalogue of the Botanical Art Collection at the Hunt Institute. Selected watercolours are offered and sold at auction, including Ashcroft and Moore.
