= Angélique Gérard =

French businesswoman and writer

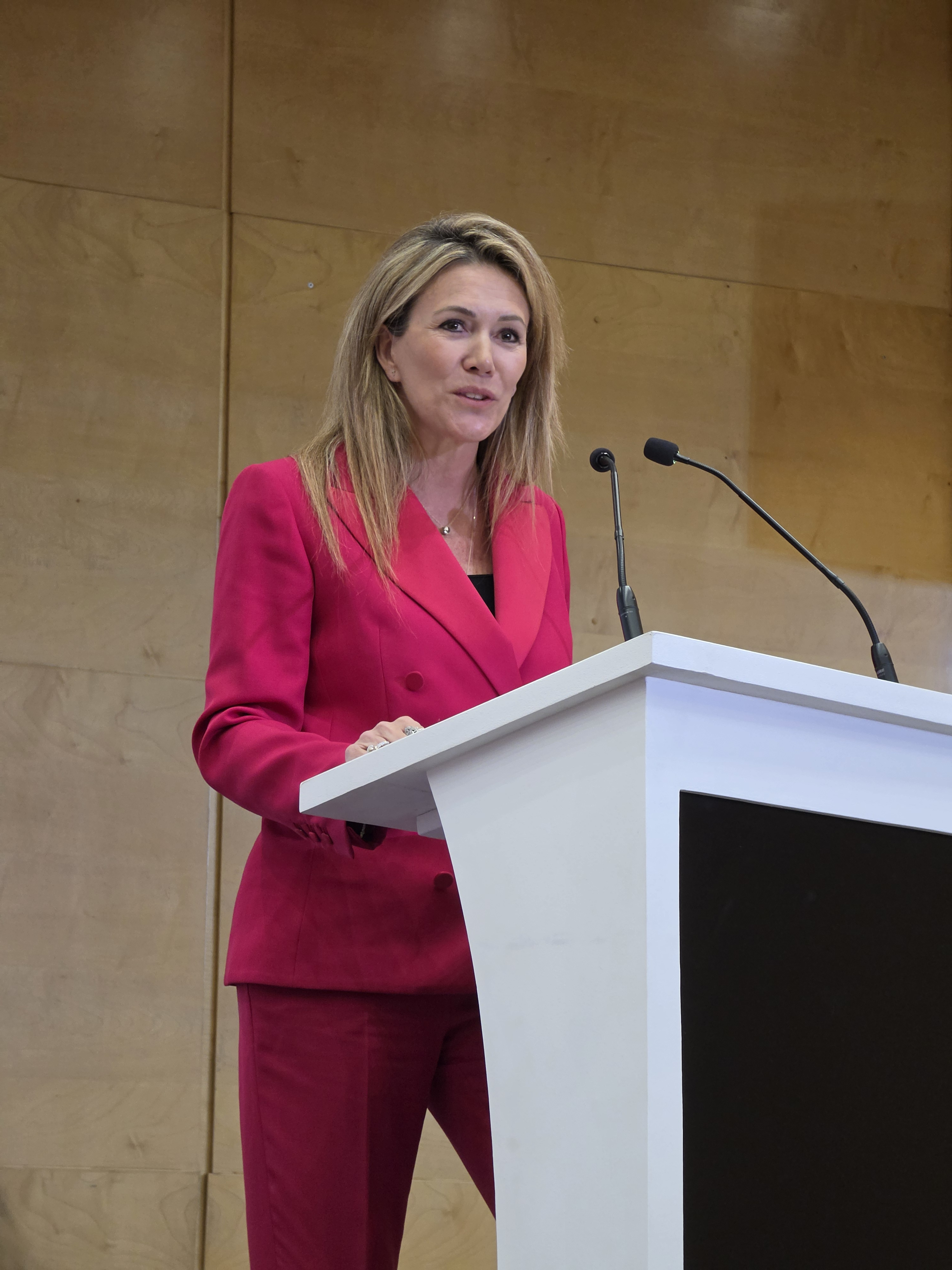
- Born: 13 June 1975 (age 51); Fontainebleau, France
- Education: INSEAD
- Employer: ILIAD
- Title: Director of Customer Relations

Angélique Gérard (née Dilscher, June 13, 1975 in Fontainebleau) is a French business executive, entrepreneur, author, and speaker. She is recognized for her major role in the development of the Iliad Group and its subsidiaries Free and Free Mobile, as well as for her contributions to issues of leadership, customer experience, digital transformation, and diversity in scientific and technological fields.

== Biography ==
Gérard was born in Fontainebleau, France. She obtained a university diploma in technology (DUT) in marketing techniques before joining the Iliad Group in 1999 at the age of 23. A graduate of INSEAD and trained in management at HEC, she develops expertise at the intersection of customer relations, management, legal matters and organizational transformation.

== Career ==
Angélique Gérard is co-founder of the Iliad Group and actively participates in the construction and development of Free and then Free Mobile.

For 22 years, she supported the group in strategic roles, notably in charge of customer experience and the legal department dedicated to subscribers, as well as supporting operational field teams. She contributed to structuring innovative subscriber relationship systems, favoring an approach centered on service quality, operational performance, and team engagement.

It plays a key role in the evolution of customer relationship models in France, by developing and managing contact centers and anticipating major transformations in consumer usage, marked by an increasing hybridization of channels (telephone, digital, self-care, video, social networks).

During the three years following her executive duties, she accompanied Xavier Niel as a special advisor to the president and the Iliad Group, working on strategy and media issues in the telecommunications sector.

In parallel, she is developing an activity as an investor and mentor to young companies, notably within the INSEAD Business Angels Club.

She also supported the Mulliez Family Association for seven years as a qualified independent person on the Management Board.

== Recognitions ==
Gérard is included in the "100 Economic Leaders of Tomorrow" ranking by the Choiseul Institute. She reached first place in 2015, succeeding Emmanuel Macron, who had held this position for two consecutive years. On 14 November 2016, Angélique Gérard received the Cross of Knight of the National Order of Merit.

Forbes magazine named her one of the 40 most inspiring French women. Following this recognition, she served for four years as a jury member for the "30 Under 30" list. Since 2025, she has been a jury member for the "Forbes Women" list.

== Other works ==
Angélique Gérard is president of STEM Academy, a training organization specializing in artificial intelligence and technological skills. In this capacity, she frequently speaks at conferences on topics such as AI, digital transformation, leadership, and the evolution of professions.

She is also president of Women in STEM Europe, an organization committed to promoting gender diversity in science and technology fields. In this capacity, she regularly speaks to the media to promote the inclusion of women in STEM careers and to contribute to discussions on gender equality in the workplace.

Gerard has participated in advocacy initiatives related to women’s rights and economic empowerment. In 2025, she served as the French ambassador for the Pomellato for Women campaign organized by the Italian jewelry brand Pomellato in connection with International Women's Day. The campaign addressed issues such as economic violence against women and included participation from international figures including Jane Fonda and Kerry Washington.

== Bibliography ==
- Les intelligences multiples en entreprise. Dunod. 2019. ISBN 978-2-100-78817-0.
- Stop Sexism! Le féminisme à l'ère post #Metoo. Eyrolles. 2019. ISBN 978-2-212-57267-4.
- L'expérience client, une histoire d'émotions. Eyrolles. 2020. ISBN 978-2-212-57311-4.
- A Planet to Repay – Kawa Editions
- My starch-free cooking
