= Corey Gerrard =

Australian professional golfer (born 1985)

Corey Gerrard (born 1985) is an Australian professional golfer.

== Career ==
In 1985, Gerrard was born. He grew up in Swan Hill, Victoria, Australia. He attended St.Mary's Primary School in Swan Hill from 1995 to 1996. His secondary schooling started in 1997 when enrolled at MacKillop College, Swan Hill and graduated in 2002. In 2003, he enrolled in a Bachelor of Business undergraduate degree at Charles Sturt University.

In 2009, Gerrard joined the PGA Tour of Australasia.

== Personal life ==
In 2014, he had a son.
