= Martin Gerrard =

English cricketer (born 1967)

Personal information
- Full name: Martin James Gerrard
- Born: 19 May 1967 (age 59); Southmead, Bristol, England
- Batting: Right-handed
- Role: Bowler

Domestic team information
- Years: Team
- 1991–1993: Gloucestershire

Career statistics
Competition	FC	List A
Matches	20	13
Runs scored	107	23
Batting average	42	5.75
100s/50s	0/0	0/0
Top score	42	7
Balls bowled	2574	587
Wickets	36	7
Bowling average	38.36	63.00
5 wickets in innings	1	0
10 wickets in match	1	0
Best bowling	6/40	2/35
Catches/stumpings	7/0	1/0
- Source: Cricinfo, 28 July 2013

Martin Gerrard (born 19 May 1967) is a former English cricketer. He played for Gloucestershire between 1991 and 1993.
