= Roy Gerrard =

English author and illustrator

Roy Gerrard (25 January 1935 – 5 August 1997) was an English author and illustrator who wrote a number of picture books for children.
