= Frédéric Gérard =

French botanist (1806–1857)

Frédéric Gérard (1806–1857) was a French botanist and early evolutionary thinker.

Gérard was influenced by the ideas of Étienne Geoffroy Saint-Hilaire and Jean-Baptiste Lamarck. He was editor in chief of Dictionnaire universel d'histoire naturelle, which he contributed to. He authored Extraits du Dictionnaire universel d'histoire naturelle. In 1845, in the Dictionnaire, he coined the expression "theory of the evolution of organized beings". Science historian Goulven Laurent argued that Gérard was the first to propose a clear scientific theory of evolution (1844-1845), and that he used the term "evolution" rather than transformism. By evolution, Gérard was referring to transformation of species over time by direct pressure from a changing environment. Charles Darwin had read an extract "Geographie zoologique" from this work in 1845.

== Selected publications ==
- De la description en histoire naturelle (1844)
- Extraits du Dictionnaire universel d'histoire naturelle (1845)
