= Sina Gerard =

Rwandan businessman

Sina Gérard (born 1963) is a Rwandan serial and social entrepreneur, the owner and manager of the food-processing company Urwibutso Enterprises. He is also a pig farmer, timber maker, bakery owner, supermarket owner, spice maker, and philanthropist. He was born in the Northern Province, the district of Rulindo; sector of Bushoki and cell of Nyirangarama. The latter, Nyirangarama, became his nickname because of the impact of the business on the community. He is married and has 5 children (girls only).

Sina Gerard is known for his commitment to local development. The company he started in 1983, Urwibutso Enterprises, has grown from a small shop to multiple branches around the country of Rwanda. The company Urwibutso, has generated 280 full-time jobs and 600 part-time jobs in the rural area where Sina is a native. The company works with an average of 3,000 families involved with farming. Sina has also provided contracted farmers with social programs such as microcredit financing, education, and agronomic training programs.

The impact of his work has been recognized internationally, and he has received many awards from it. The list of his awards includes the Diamond International Quality Crown, the New Era Award for Technology, Quality, and Innovation, and the Made in Rwanda Award.

Sina is currently one of the wealthiest men in Rwanda and the Urwibutso Enterprises is a multi-million dollar business empire.

== Career ==
=== Start ===
Sina Gérard started Urwibutso Enterprises at the age of 20, in 1983. He used a starting capital of 33,000RWF (2013 value) and produce from his parents' farm to start a small bakery. With his bakery, his launched his signature Urwibutso donuts, which later became the name of his multiple ventures. When his bakery started producing a return on investment, Sina expanded and ventured into fruit-juice making.

=== Mid-career ===
In 1999, seeing that his newly added product was successful, he invested in juice-making equipment. Sina partnered with more local farmers, and invested in the research of juice preservation techniques. The Agashya juices, especially the passion fruit nectar, also became popular on the market. Sina then diversified his enterprises further: he added a piggery project; cattle, goat, rabbit rearing units; and wine production and chili production. The chili Akabanga became one of his most consumed products, not just in Rwanda, but across the African continent and other parts of the world. Sina says of Akabanga, "It means something like ‘the secret’. If you put it on your food, you will understand the secret."

=== 2000s ===
From then on, Sina expanded the enterprise Urwibutso further and the company added new products ranging from biscuits to wines. Currently, Urwibutso produces an array of products which include Akanoze Maize flour, Akandi Mineral water, Agashya Pineapple juice, strawberry and passion fruit juice, Akabanga chili oil, Akaryoshye strawberry yoghurt, Akarusho white, red and banana wine as well as the 'Akarabo' biscuit.

The Akarabo biscuit was launched in collaboration with the Sweet Potato Action for Security and Health in Africa (SASHA) as well as its partners International Potato Center (CIP), Rwanda Agricultural Board (RAB), Catholic Relief Services (CRS), IMBARAGA, Young Women Christian Association(YWCA). This biscuit was created to increase both nutritional and economic aspects of rural households with women being the focus group. With his success in business Sina Gérard decided to invest back in his community. He gives farmers free seeds, fertilizer, training and buys their crops when ready for harvest. He aims to make Rwandan farmers feel proud to be farmers, as they account for 90% of the population.

=== Philanthropy work ===
Sina is also a philanthropist. He has built the school Collège Foundation Sina Gérard for students in his community. The school teaches students from the nursery school level up to secondary school. Students learn for free, even those in the boarding school. The school is built for low-income families, especially the ones Urwibutso Enterprise works with. The school trains students to build skills and knowledge in the sectors of Agriculture, Veterinary Tech and Food science.

The school now has about 1100 enrolled students. The students have access to farm cites that produce fruits like strawberries, apples, Macadamia nuts, logan fruit, fruits that are new to Rwanda. Sina plans for the school to produce students who will become PHD holders by the year of 2022. Sina aims for the school to be a center where young and low-income people build themselves up and get out of poverty.

=== Quotes ===
"I look for that very poor person and help him or her — not necessarily financially, but train them and give them more knowledge." CNN

"My aim is to make sure that the Rwandan people build themselves and get out of poverty," CNN

"My aim is to make sure Rwandan farmers, because they are rated at 90%, feel proud to be farmers. I'm sure I'll achieve it because so far I have achieved a lot."

== Achievements ==
- Diamond International Quality Crown. 2011.
- The new Era Award for Technology, Quality and Innovation. 2012
- Made in Rwanda Award. 2018
