= László Farkas (sailor) =

Hungarian sailor

Personal information
- Nationality: Hungarian
- Born: 18 December 1941 (age 83); Veszprém, Hungary

Sport
- Sport: Sailing

László Farkas (born 18 December 1941) is a Hungarian sailor. He competed in the Star event at the 1968 Summer Olympics.
