= Arthur Gerrard =

Australian rules footballer

Personal information
- Full name: Arthur Edward Gerrard
- Born: 28 April 1886; Seymour, Victoria
- Died: 2 July 1977 (aged 91); Seymour, Victoria
- Original team: Mangalore

Playing career^{1}
Years	Club	Games (Goals)
1906	St Kilda	1 (0)
- ^{1} Playing statistics correct to the end of 1906.

Arthur Edward Gerrard (28 April 1886 – 2 July 1977) was an Australian rules footballer who played for the St Kilda Football Club in the Victorian Football League (VFL).
