= Susan Stanton =

American politician

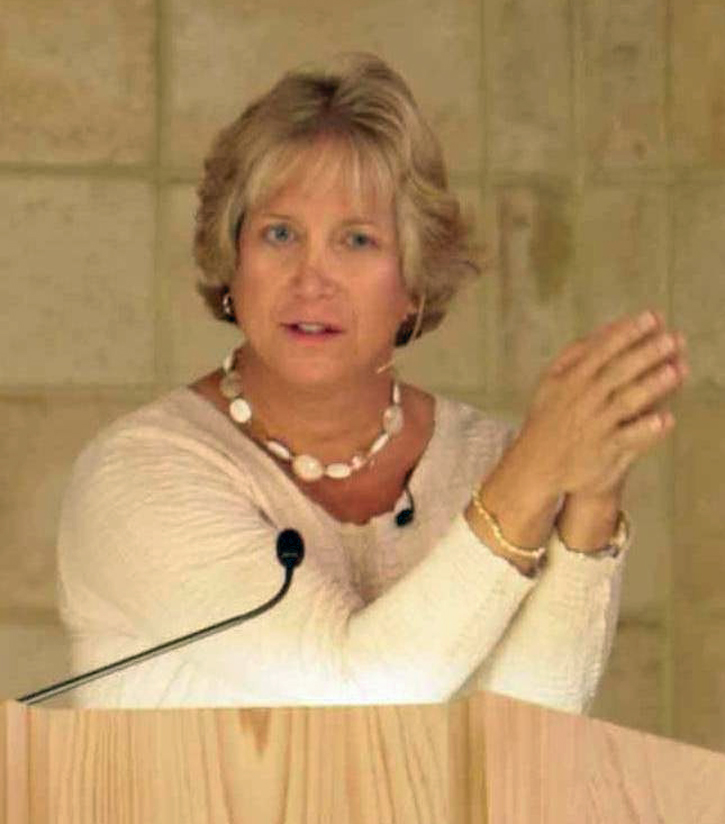
- Spouse: Donna Becker (Divorced)
- Children: Travis Stanton

Susan Stanton was the city manager of Largo, Florida, until her termination in 2007. She was city manager of Lake Worth, Florida, from 2009 until her termination in December 2011 by a newly elected City Commission. After serving as City Manager in Greenfield, California for four years, she served as Chief Operating Officer of Administrative Services of the Santa Clara Valley Water District in San Jose, California until her resignation on November 30, 2017. On September 11, 2020, she was ordained to the Priesthood in the Episcopal Church by Bishop Lucinda Ashby in Carmel-by-the-Sea, California.

She grew up in the Catskill Mountains in New York. Stanton was married to Donna Becker and they have a son named Travis. Stanton became the subject of national and international media attention in February 2007 after disclosing that she is transgender and would be pursuing sex reassignment, leading Largo city commissioners to initiate the process of ending her contract as city manager, a decision which Stanton appealed.

== Early life and education ==
Susan Stanton grew up in the Catskill Mountains of New York. Her public school years were relatively uneventful. She later recalled being rejected as a drummer in the sixth grade band and, in ninth grade, being told by a coach that at 5 feet 9 she was too short to play on the basketball team. In high school she worked cleaning offices at night for 30 hours a week, and she was a typist for the yearbook, her only extracurricular activity. Stanton earned a bachelor's degree in political science and a master's degree in public administration from the University of Florida in Gainesville.

== Career ==
Early in her career, Stanton held positions at various times as assistant to the city manager of Newburgh, New York; administrative assistant to the borough manager of Ketchikan Gateway Borough, Alaska; and assistant to the city manager of Champaign, Illinois.

=== Berea, Kentucky ===
As city administrator in Berea, Kentucky, a position she held for about four years, Stanton took part in negotiations which brought four manufacturing companies to Berea, representing a total capital investment in the city of $120 million and annual payrolls of $10 million. The industries included Tokico Ltd., which planned to build a $20 million shock absorber and brake assembly plant that would employ 150 people, and Alcan Aluminum, which built a $50 million aluminum recycling plant. The Alcan plant became the largest used aluminum can recycling facility in the world. Stanton received an honorary award from Kentucky governor Wallace Wilkinson, who named Stanton a Kentucky Colonel.

=== Largo, Florida ===
Stanton was hired away from Berea to become assistant city manager in Largo, Florida in August 1990. Stanton worked under city manager Stephen Bonczek until April 20, 1993, when Bonczek resigned under pressure from city commissioners, who were unhappy with Bonczek's poor relationship with city workers and unions. At that point Stanton became interim city manager, and was formally hired as acting city manager in May 1993 (with a consequent rise in salary). City commissioners cited their confidence in Stanton, as well as the time and cost of recruiting a replacement for Bonczek, as their reason for hiring in-house. City Clerk Henry Schubert was reassigned at the same time to the post of assistant city manager. Both assignments were open-ended, with the commission delaying its decision on a permanent city manager until later that year. Stanton's posting was made permanent in September 1993, with an 18-month contract and another increase in salary.

In total, Stanton had a career spanning 17 years with the City of Largo and as of 2007, had spent 14 years as city manager where she reportedly received good reviews for her performance. In September 2006, she was given an $11,000 annual pay raise, bringing her annual salary to over $140,000. She managed a $130-million budget and about 1,200 employees.

Stanton was on paid administrative leave while the City of Largo began the legal process of terminating her contract, pursuant to her confirmation on February 21, 2007, to the St. Petersburg Times that she was transgender and was in the process of pursuing sex reassignment.

=== Continuing her career ===
After her termination from the City of Largo, Stanton had her name legally changed to Susan Ashley Stanton. Stanton decided to continue her long professional career in public policy and politics while undergoing gender transition. Stanton appeared in public for the first time as a woman on May 9, 2007. Stanton lobbied Congress on behalf of laws to protect gay and transgender people from employment discrimination. Stanton testified before Congress, appeared on TV with Larry King and Montel Williams and became the somewhat reluctant face of the transgender-equality movement. Susan applied for more than 100 positions in city management, but had interviewed in less than half a dozen cities. Atlanta's Gay Pride Parade asked Stanton to be grand marshal. A Chicago transgender convention invited her to speak. The City of Sarasota named Stanton a finalist for its city manager job. Stanton was eventually named third for the position as city manager in Sarasota, FL, but didn't get the job.

=== Lake Worth, Florida ===
Two years after losing her job as Largo city manager, Susan Stanton was picked to lead Lake Worth, Florida. Stanton was selected as City Manager of Lake Worth, Florida, on April 7, 2009, by a 4–1 vote. Lake Worth City Commissioner Suzanne Mulvehill said she liked Stanton's approach to marketing the city and her ability to work for such a long time in Largo. Commissioner Cara Jennings said she favored Stanton because of her team-building approach to managing city staff. Vice Mayor Jo-Ann Golden stated, "I thought she had the right temperament for our city and, truthfully, I learned a lot from her." Mac Craig, City of Largo's current manager, stated, "I think she'll make an excellent city manager. I personally think they're lucky to have her." Stanton was selected for the job from a group of 50 candidates. Lake Worth, a city of about 37,000 people, near the ocean in Palm Beach County offered Stanton an annual salary of $150,000. Stanton was quoted as saying, "Lake Worth has a very progressive city commission and a staff that wants to improve the quality of life in the community. It's the first place I wanted to work after I left graduate school at the University of Florida."

She was terminated abruptly from her position at Lake Worth on December 6, 2011. In reflecting upon Stanton's dismissal, the Palm Beach Post noted that during her tenure "she dismissed low-performing employees and brought in smart, eager wonks. She revised union contracts that were stacked against the city. She prodded cities that owed Lake Worth for contracted services. She saved Lake Worth $2 million a year on its police and fire contracts."

=== Greenfield, California ===
In October 2012, the Greenfield City Council appointed Stanton City Manager. As Greenfield's City Manager, Stanton had oversight responsibilities for sanitary sewer and water utility systems, police, streets, drainage, parks, recreation, planning, zoning, building, community development and finance. In 2016, Greenfield became one of the most progressive communities in Monterey County to regulate dispensing, cultivation and the manufacture of medical marijuana.

=== Episcopal Diocese of Los Angeles ===
On September 11, 2020, The Rt. Rev. Lucinda Ashby ordained Stanton to the Priesthood in the Episcopal Church. In May 2021, Rev. Stanton was appointed as Director of Finance and Chief Financial Officer of the Episcopal Diocese of Los Angeles.

== Largo human rights debate ==
In 2003, a contentious debate took place in Largo over a proposed human rights ordinance that would prohibit discrimination in the municipality based on race, religion, gender, disability, gender identity, or sexual orientation. More than 100 people packed a five-hour public hearing on the proposed ordinance at Largo's City Hall on August 5, 2003, hearing testimony from over 40 people on both sides of the question. Had the ordinance passed, it would have made Largo the 64th municipality in the United States to extend equal rights protection to transgender people through the inclusion of gender identity. However, the proposed ordinance failed by a 4 to 3 vote of the City Commission, leaving both gender identity and sexual orientation as permissible reasons for Largo residents to be discriminated against in employment, housing, and public accommodations.

City workers did, however, receive protection three months later on October 7, 2003, when the City Commission unanimously approved the Discrimination and Harassment Prohibition policy, an internal antidiscrimination policy, that applied to all city employees. In contrast with the city-wide August debate, not even one individual opposing the internal policy attended the commission meeting.

The city employee policy prohibited discrimination and harassment on the basis of race, religion, age, gender, disability, sexual orientation, and gender identity or expression. The policy applied to city employees and prohibited discriminatory conduct both in the workplace and in any work-related setting, such as during business trips. The policy included definitions of harassment and retaliation, and explained that sexual harassment could involve individuals of the same or different gender. Extensive training for all city employees was set to take place in November and December 2003, under Stanton's direction in her role as city manager. The policy was passed partly in reaction to two incidents in which a fire department lieutenant and a police officer made racial slurs.

== Transgender issues ==
=== Struggle with being transgender ===
Stanton reports having had thoughts of transitioning since she was a child, and recalls wearing her sister's clogs when she was age 6 or 7 to walk to the candy store. In adolescence, she tried on her mother's tennis dress, and while in college she went to the library to read about cross-dressing. After graduation, she threw away all her "girl clothes" after deciding that cross-dressing was incompatible with a career in municipal government. She continued to collect women's items, but purged them with each new job.

In 1990, Stanton married her wife Donna, and thought she had closed the "cross-dressing" chapter of her life. She and her wife had a son, Travis, in 1993, shortly after she became acting city manager of Largo. However, in 1997 she became involved in an Internet chat group for cross-dressers.

=== Decision to pursue sex reassignment ===
Stanton supported the proposed city-wide ordinance, though she did not take a prominent role in the debate that surrounded it. Afterwards, she began to discuss her feelings with a therapist who had testified in support of the ordinance, and ultimately made the decision along with her wife to pursue sex reassignment. Since then, Stanton underwent counseling, with clinical psychologist and gender therapist Kathleen Farrell, and hormone replacement therapy in preparation for sex reassignment surgery at some future date.

=== Preparing to go public ===
Stanton met privately with Largo City Mayor Pat Gerard on January 1, 2007, to inform her that she was transgender and intended to begin the final stages of gender transition in the coming year. Stanton shared her plans only with a very small group of confidential advisers, including her wife, a medical team and a few top officials at City Hall. Stanton and Gerard worked together to write an eight-page plan to help make her decision public in June, a time chosen because Stanton's 13-year-old son could be out of town and be shielded from the attendant publicity.

=== "Outed" ===
An unidentified source leaked Stanton's intentions to the St. Petersburg Times, and on February 20, 2007, a reporter went to Stanton's office for a regular weekly meeting and informed her that the paper had received a tip. Stanton had little choice but to sit for an interview even though she had not yet discussed the situation with her son. An interview was scheduled for the following morning to give Stanton time to talk with her family. Stanton was accompanied by Largo Mayor Pat Gerard during the interview. Stanton informed her son that she was transgender that night.

On February 21, 2007, the St. Petersburg Times published a news article on the Internet regarding Stanton's intentions. A press conference was held at City Hall the same day. Stanton and Mayor Pat Gerard explained the plans and events they had developed to make Stanton's transgender identity public in June. Stanton disclosed that she would begin wearing dresses to work on April 2 and would be known from that day forward as Susan Stanton.

Also on February 21, 2007, Stanton sent an email to city employees explaining the situation. "Like many transgendered people," Stanton wrote, "I have privately struggled with this very personal matter all of my life and have kept it secret from my family, friends and co-workers. I hoped I could outrun it when I got married, became a father and found a job I love. Unfortunately, I was wrong." She stated her intention to continue in her job as Largo city manager throughout her transition. In addition to her email, Stanton provided two pages of "historical information about myself and my plans for the future."

Largo Police Chief Lester Aradi sent out another email that same day to employees of the Largo Police Department, expressing support for Stanton and reminding police officers that inappropriate comments, jokes or other communications in the work environment were not appropriate or allowed.

=== Public reaction ===
Following the breaking of Stanton's story, e-mails and faxes to the city from Largo residents were mostly negative, while non-Largo residents sent mostly positive notes. Anonymous blog postings were generally negative or expressed confusion. Initially there was little interest from national media. One concern commonly expressed by both city residents and city employees was whether Stanton's sex reassignment surgery would be paid for by taxpayers; in fact, Stanton's counseling and hormonal treatments were paid for by Stanton herself, as will be her eventual surgery.

=== Personal impacts on Stanton and family ===
Stanton had hoped to remain married, but was uncertain what would happen. She said that her wife had been dealing with an upsetting situation as best as she can. On Larry King Live on April 13, 2007, Stanton announced that she and her wife were separating. In August, 2008, Stanton announced that her marriage had come to an end. Susan Stanton agreed to pay alimony and child support to her ex-wife. Stanton was assaulted while out running, though Stanton was uncertain if it was related to the controversy. She suffered a few small scratches on her nose.

== Job loss ==
=== Largo City Commission vote to end Stanton's employment ===
By the end of the week following Stanton's public outing on February 21, 2007, Commissioner Mary Gray Black, apparently the only commissioner Stanton had not personally informed of her plans, called for a special meeting of the city commission to discuss Stanton's contract and future employment. To terminate Stanton's employment according to the Largo city charter, five of the seven city commissioners would have to vote in the affirmative. According to Stanton's contract, upon her dismissal a severance package would include 12 months' salary unless she were convicted of a felony, had violated the state code of ethics, or had committed "gross misconduct."

A special meeting of the city commission was held on February 27, 2007. It lasted four hours and was attended by 444 members of the public. Approximately 60 individuals, mostly Largo residents, testified. In a five to two vote, the commission voted to place Stanton on administrative leave until her termination could be made final. Mayor Pat Gerard and Commissioner Rodney Woods were the two commissioners who voted to retain Stanton. Commissioners then named assistant city manager Norton "Mac" Craig as acting city manager.

=== Attempt to retain position ===
The vote taken by the Largo City Commission on February 27, 2007, began the three-step process necessary to remove Stanton as the city manager. Stanton was placed on paid administrative leave while the city began the legal process required to end her contract, which stipulates that she can be fired at any time without cause with a 5–2 vote. The commission must vote a second time to formally remove Stanton from her position.

The National Center for Lesbian Rights (NCLR) was assisting Stanton in an attempt to persuade the City Commission to reverse its decision to terminate her employment. NCLR had stated they would represent Stanton in legal proceedings, if necessary, in an effort to help her regain her position. Stanton appealed the City Commission's decision to fire her on March 8, 2007, and planned to seek a public hearing within 30 days at which she intended to make a presentation of up to three hours on transgender individuals and the workplace transition process for transgender people.

=== National media interest ===
On February 28, 2007, the day following the special commission meeting, Stanton, reportedly surprised by the abrupt loss of her job, began fielding calls and taking part in interviews with local television stations. She was also interviewed by Michele Norris of National Public Radio.

Stanton told the St. Petersburg Times that she didn't want to waste the opportunity such media interest provided to help "the next person that comes out with the same disclosure so he doesn't suffer the same consequences." By that afternoon, Stanton had received approximately 45 media calls.

On April 17, 2007, The Daily Show with correspondent Rob Riggle featured a segment of Stanton's firing. In March 2010, Stanton was the subject of a two-hour CNN documentary, "Her Name was Steven", about her transition from man to woman.

=== Reaction from national LGBT community ===
Transgender activists immediately protested the decision to fire Stanton. One LGBT rights group, the National Sexuality Resource Center, started a 'Stand with Stanton' petition to pressure the City Commission of Largo, Florida to reverse their decision.

The Human Rights Campaign reported that if the vote to fire Stanton was upheld, the Largo city commissioners would be "in direct violation of the city government's own internal non-discrimination policy... that explicitly prohibits discrimination in public employment on the basis of gender identity and expression," referring to the city's Discrimination and Harassment Prohibition policy, adopted in October 2003. The National Center for Lesbian Rights similarly denounced the commission's decision to fire Stanton, also citing the city's internal non-discrimination policy.

=== Support in the local community ===
On 3 March 2007, the St. Petersburg Times published the results of a survey conducted on its behalf by Communications Center Inc. of Lakeland, Florida. The survey found that a majority of adults in the city of Largo and in Pinellas County, where Largo is located, believed the commission had been wrong to move to fire Stanton as city manager. The survey also found widespread acceptance among city and county residents for transgender persons in the workplace, whether in the public or private sector.

An interfaith coalition of local religious leaders organized a protest at Largo City Hall to urge the City Commission to reconsider its decision to fire Stanton. The religious leaders involved in the protest wished to counteract the religion-based claims of other religious leaders that supported Stanton's termination as city manager. A total of 350 people, including clerics and congregation members from more than a dozen local churches and synagogues, attended the 30-minute protest on March 6.

=== Fired ===
On March 23 during a six-hour meeting of Largo city council, the motion was made to terminate Stanton's employment. Commissioner Black tabled a motion to terminate the city manager's contract of employment. After a brief deliberation, this was upheld by five of the commissioners while Mayor Pat Gerard and Commissioner Rodney Woods dissented. Thus, at five minutes past midnight, Stanton's employment officially ended.

The five commissioners who voted to uphold the decision to fire Stanton contended that her employment was terminated due to a loss of confidence in her and had nothing to do with her impending transition; "You have to believe us, you have to trust us, it is not about transgenderism," Commissioner Gay Gentry was reported to have said. However, the city commissioners did not even consider firing her before her plans to become a woman had been announced.

=== Announces intent not to sue ===
On April 13, 2007, Stanton appeared on the Larry King Live show on CNN accompanied by her attorney, Karen Doering, of the National Center for Lesbian Rights. She announced on the program that she "absolutely" would not sue the city, comparing a potential suit against the city as "like suing my mother."
