= James Gilbert Gerard =

Scottish surgeon

- Born: 1795
- Died: 31 March 1835 (aged 39–40)
- Occupation: Surgeon

James Gilbert Gerard (1795 – 31 March 1835) was a Scottish surgeon and explorer.

== Biography ==
Gerard son of Gilbert Gerard, D.D, brother of Alexander and of Patrick Gerard, was born in 1795. Probably he is the ‘Gerard, Jacobus, Aberdoniensis,’ who entered the King's or Marischal College as in 1807, but there is some doubt. On 27 November 1814 he was appointed assistant-surgeon on the Bengal establishment and became surgeon 5 May 1826. He accompanied his brother Alexander in several of his Himalayan journeys, and was author of ‘Observations on the Spité Valley and the circumjacent Country within the Himalayas’ in ‘Asiat. Researches’ (1833), xviii. 238–79, and of the ‘Account of a Visit to the Shotool and Borendo Passes’ in Sir William Lloyd's book. His regimental service was chiefly in the hills with the 1st Nusseerabad battalion. In 1831 he volunteered to accompany Sir Alexander Burnes in his expedition across the Hindu Khoosh to Bokhara. Sufficient credit has not been given to Gerard for the scientific accuracy which his assistance lent to the geographical information collected by Burnes (Journ. Roy. Geog. Soc. Lond. xii. 133). From his notebooks his brother Alexander prepared a map of the return route from Herat to Peshawur. His brother writes: ‘His trip to Bokhara with Colonel Sir Alexander Burnes was a mad-like expedition for him, as he had long been unwell and was obliged to leave his bed to go, and could only travel in a palkee [palanquin]. It was … at his own particular request that Burnes applied for him. The trip killed him, for he had several attacks of fever on his way to Bokhara, and Burnes again and again urged him either to return or stop at Cabool until he recovered, but he would do neither. … On his return he was detained three months at Meshed, and no less than eight at Herat, by fever, so that on his arrival at Subathoo his constitution was completely worn out. He … gradually declined. Patrick and I were with him the whole time he survived, which was just a year, for I got leave of absence to prepare a map of the route from his notes; for he observed the bearings, estimated the distances, and noted the villages all the way from Herat to the Indus. … It was a splendid map, 10 ft. long by 3 ft. wide, on a scale of 5 in. to the mile. At my brother's dying request I presented it to Sir Charles Metcalfe, then governor-general, from whom I received a thousand thanks. The map is now [1840] with the army on the Indus, and … they have found the position of the roads wonderfully correct, considering the distances were estimated by time and the bearings taken with a small pocket-compass.’ Gerard died at Subathoo 31 March 1835.

The German geographer, Carl Ritter, has noticed the valuable services rendered by the three brothers Gerard to the cause of geographical science (Ritter, Der Erdkunde von Asien (1829), Band ii. S. 546).
