= Marcos Gerard =

Mexican sailor (born 1950)

Personal information
- Born: 15 April 1950 (age 74); Mexico City, Mexico

Sport
- Sport: Sailing

Marcos Gerard (born 15 April 1950) is a Mexican sailor. He competed in the Star event at the 1968 Summer Olympics.
