= Patricia Gerard =

American politician

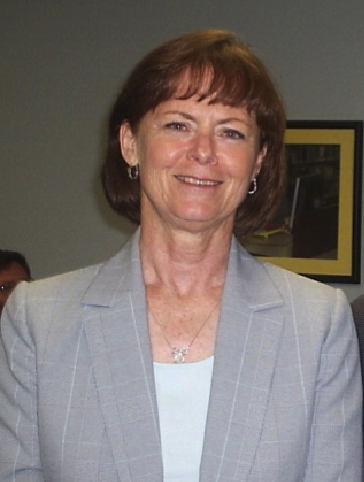

Member of the Pinellas County Commission from the 2nd district
- In office 2014–2022
- Preceded by: Norm Roche
- Succeeded by: Brian Scott

Mayor of Largo, Florida
- In office 2006–2014
- Preceded by: Robert E. Jackson
- Succeeded by: Woody Brown

Personal details
- Born: Paterson, New Jersey, U.S.
- Education: University of South Florida (BA, MA)

Patricia "Pat" Gerard is an American Democratic politician. From 2014 to 2022, she was a member of the Pinellas County Commission from the 2nd District. Previously, she served as mayor for the city of Largo, Florida.

== Career ==
She earned a Bachelor of Arts degree in Psychology and a Master of Arts in Rehabilitation Counseling from the University of South Florida. Gerard was a mental health worker in a community-based rehabilitation program after graduating from USF. From 1984 to 1986 she worked as Victim's Advocate for the Largo Police Department. From 1986 to 1992 she worked as director of the Spouse Abuse Shelter of Religious Community Services, where she stayed until 1992. After that, she worked for Family Resources, Inc. as Executive Director of Helpline. She is currently their COO.

She has served on numerous boards, including Suncoast Tiger Bay Board, the Business and Professional Women of St. Petersburg, Leadership Pinellas, Pinellas County Homeless Leadership Board, the United Way Council, Pinellas County Victim Rights Coalition, Pinellas County Domestic Violence Task Force, Florida Coalition Against Domestic Violence, Governor's Coordinating Council on Victim's Rights, and the Florida Alliance of Information and Referral Services Board.

== Political career ==
She was elected to the City Commission in 2000 and again in 2003. She became mayor by defeating her predecessor, Robert E. Jackson, in 2006 in a bitterly contested race.

Gerard and Commissioner Rodney Woods were the two dissenting votes when the Largo City Commission voted to terminate City Manager Stanton following her announcement of her decision to undergo sex reassignment surgery. In a CNN interview, Gerard explained her position of support for Stanton saying, "We're making a decision here about whether we're going to be an inclusive and compassionate community or are we going to be small-minded and bigoted."

In October 2013, Gerard announced she was running for the Pinellas County Commission District 2 seat. She defeated Ed Hooper, who had defeated incumbent Norm Roche in the Republican Primary, 51% to 49%. In 2018, she won re-election unopposed. In 2022, she was defeated for re-election by Republican Brian Scott, 54.3% to 46.6%.

== Personal life ==
. Gerard was born in Paterson, New Jersey. She is married and has one child, writer Sarah Gerard.
