= Sarah Gerard =

American author and novelist

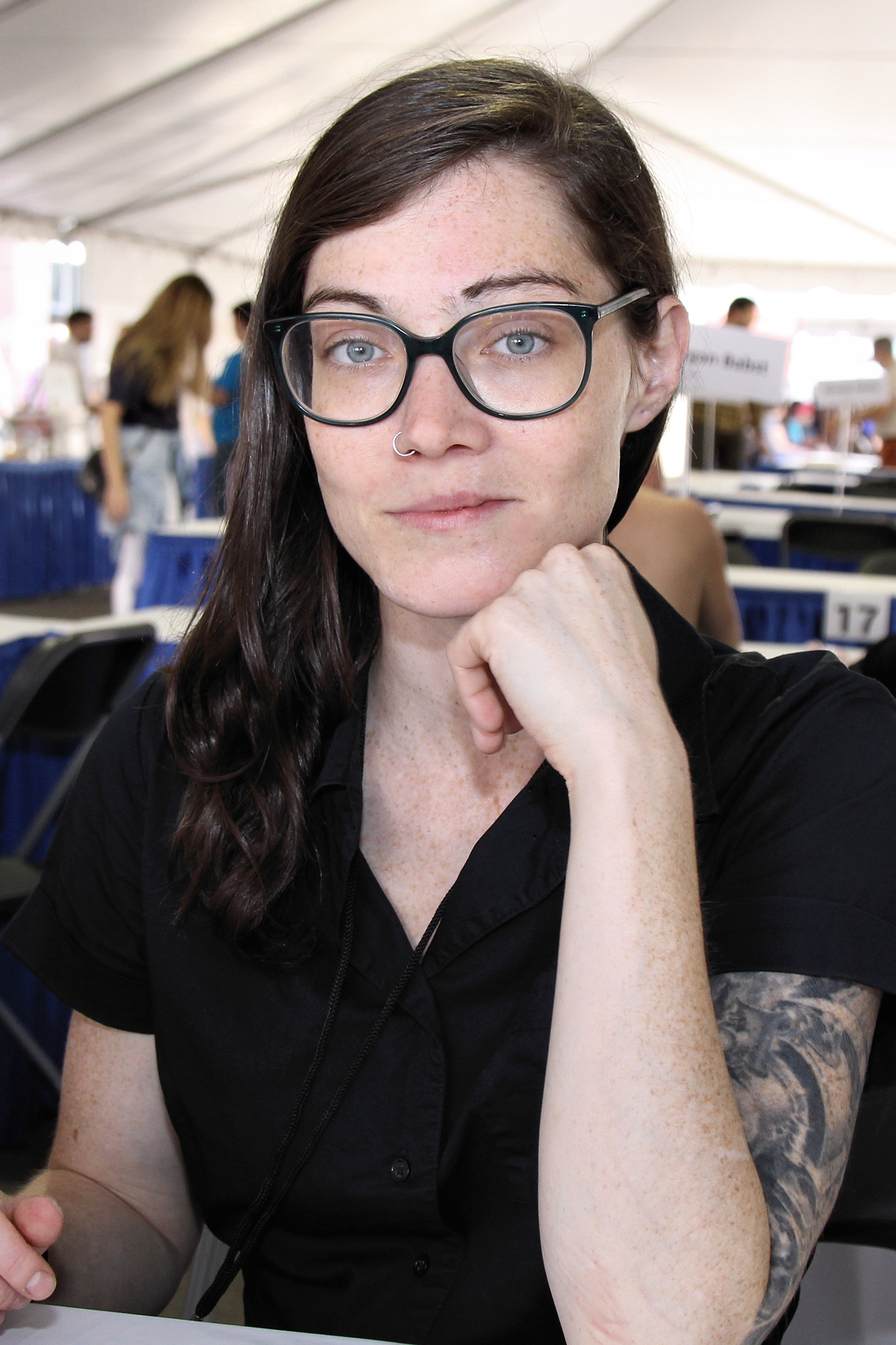
- Gerard at the 2017 Texas Book Festival
- Born: Clearwater, Florida, U.S.
- Education: The New School (MFA)
- Occupations: Novelist, writer
- Writing career
- Genre: Fiction
- Notable work: Binary Star

Sarah Gerard is an American writer of fiction and nonfiction. She worked for Bomb Magazine. She is the author of three books. The first, a novel, Binary Star, was published in 2015 by Two Dollar Radio. It was a finalist for the Los Angeles Times Art Seidenbaum Award for First Fiction, and was listed as a best book of the year by NPR and Vanity Fair. It received positive reviews in GQ and The New York Times.

Her essay collection, Sunshine State, was published in 2017. A second novel, True Love, was published by HarperCollins in 2020.

== Writing career ==
Gerard's writing has been included in the anthologies We Can’t Help It If We’re From Florida, Retro 4: Selections from Joyland Magazine, and Best Short Stories from the Saturday Evening Post (2015). Her short stories, essays, interviews, and criticism have appeared in Granta, The Baffler, New York Magazine, The Paris Review Daily, BOMB Magazine, Vice, Bookforum, and Joyland. She has written two monthly columns for the online journal, Hazlitt. Her column Mouthful chronicled her relationship with food ten years into recovery from anorexia and bulimia, and was illustrated by her paper collages. Gerard published Recycle, a co-authored book of collages and text, with the independent art press Pacific, in 2018. She has taught creative writing at Columbia University and Sarah Lawrence College, and was the 2018 – 2019 Writer-in-Residence at New College of Florida.

On June 1, 2021, she was named a winner of the Jim Duggins Outstanding Mid-Career Novelists' Prize from the Lambda Literary Foundation.

== Personal life ==
Gerard is the daughter of Florida politician Pat Gerard.

Gerard attended The New School, where she received an MFA.

== Bibliography ==
- Things I Told My Mother (2013)
- Binary Star (2015)
- BFF (2015)
- Sunshine State (2017)
- Recycle (2018)
- True Love (2020)
- The Butter House (2023)
- Carrie Carolyn Coco (2024)
