= Edward Gerrard (footballer) =

English footballer (1900–1987)

Personal information
- Full name: Edward Gerrard
- Date of birth: 1 December 1900
- Place of birth: Aspull, England
- Date of death: 1987 (aged 86–87)
- Position: Wing half

Senior career*
Years	Team	Apps	(Gls)
1924–1925	Hindley Colliery		
1925–1926	Preston North End	10	(0)
Total		10	(0)
- * Club domestic league appearances and goals

Edward Gerrard (1 December 1900 – 1987) was an English footballer who played in the Football League for Preston North End.
