= Gilbert Gerard (MP for City of Chester) =

Member of the Parliament of England

Gilbert Gerard (fl. 1575–1609) was an English Member of Parliament for Chester in Elizabeth I's 8th Parliament in 1593. (Note: "There has been much confusion about Gerard’s origins. He is variously stated to have been the son of Sir Gilbert Gerard, master of the rolls, of Thomas Gerard I, 1st Baron Gerard of Gerrard’s Bromley, and of William Gerard III of Harrow, clerk of the council of the duchy of Lancaster" (N.M.S. 1981).)

== Biography ==
Gilbert Gerard was the first son and heir of William Gerard (died 1581) and Dorothy, daughter of Andrew Barton of Smithills, Lancashire. He succeeded to his father's estate in 1581.

In 1593 he was well enough established to represent Chester in Parliament and by 1593 he was Customer of Chester (he duties on French and Rhenish wines) and held the position for a number of years.

== Family ==
Gerard married Ellen, daughter of William Pearson of Chester.
