= Gilbert Gerard of Crewood =

Gilbert Gerard (1604–1673) of Crewood Hall, Frodsham, Cheshire, was a colonel in the Parliamentary army during the First English Civil War and a justice of the peace during the Interregnum. He was active in local administration and around the county of Cheshire.

== Biography ==
In the 1630s Gerard realised that his estate of Crewood was well located to take advantage of the salt trade. He organised the transportation of salt in flat bottomed barges from Pickering ford down the river Weaver to Liverpool (this business must have been successful because in 1678 he built a salt house beside the river and his son Benjamin became a "citizen and Salter of London").

In the early 1640s a significant portion of Gerard's local parish congregation were puritans and Gerard was their lay spokesman. He was also served as a head constable. (Note: John Morrill observes that head constable was far below the position of in 17th century society of a Justice of the Peace, that Gerard held after the First Civil War and during the Interregnum.)

At the outbreak of the Civil War Gerard joined the Parliamentary army. He was governor of the garrison at Northwich, fought in the Battle of Tarvin in 1643, and he successful Parliamentary siege of Chester under the command of Sir William Brereton. Gerard, like several other minor gentry in the region, seems to have flourished under the patronage of Sir William,He proved not only to be a competent military officer, but also an administrator and was successful in raising Proposition money from the parishes of Bucklow, Edisbury and the Northwich hundreds.

After the First Civil War and through the Interregnum (England) Gerard was a justice of the peace (JP). It was as a JP that he helped in suppressing the Booth's Rebellion in 1659.

At the restoration of the monarchy Gerard lost his position as JP. In 1665 he was arrested for treason, but no records survive of his involvement in a plot.

== Family ==
Married and had seven sons and six daughters.

== See also ==
- Bunbury Agreement
