= Thomas John Gerrard =

English priest

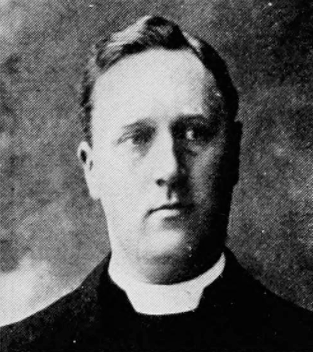
- Born: 1871; Lancashire, England
- Died: January 1916 (aged 44–45); England
- Occupation(s): Clergyman, writer

Thomas John Gerrard (1871–1916) was an English priest who wrote about the Catholic Church and eugenics.

== Biography ==
Thomas John Gerrard was born in Lancashire in 1871.

He wrote several books, including The Church and eugenics, Marriage and parenthood: the Catholic ideal (1911, re-published in 1937 and 2009), and Bergson: an exposition and criticism from the point of view of St. Thomas.

He also wrote the entry "The Church and Eugenics" for the Catholic Encyclopedia.

He died in England in January 1916.

== Works ==
- Marriage and Parenthood, the Catholic ideal, 1911
- Bergson; An Exposition and Criticism From the Point of View of St. Thomas Aquinas, 1913
- A Challenge to the Time-Spirit, 1914
- The Church and Eugenics, 1917
