= Andrés Gerard Jr. =

Mexican sailor (born 1949)

Personal information
- Nationality: Mexican
- Born: 16 October 1949 (age 75)

Sport
- Sport: Sailing

Andrés Gerard Jr. (born 16 October 1949) is a Mexican sailor. He competed in the Star event at the 1968 Summer Olympics.
