= Alexander Gerard (explorer) =

Scottish explorer (1792–1839)

Alexander Gerard (17 February 1792 – 15 December 1839) was a Scottish army officer in India, and an early surveyor and explorer of the Himalayas.

== Early life ==
He was born in Aberdeen on 17 February 1792. His father was Gilbert Gerard, a theological writer; his grandfather was Alexander Gerard, a church minister and academic. He was brother of James Gilbert Gerard, a surgeon in India, and Patrick Gerard, a writer on geographical science in India.

In 1808 he graduated from King's College, Aberdeen, and in that year he received a Bengal cadetship. He was appointed ensign in the 13th Bengal Native Infantry on 9 September 1808.

== Surveyor ==
He was employed in the survey of the route from Delhi to Lahore in 1812. In 1814 he was promoted to lieutenant, and he surveyed the Saharanpur district, which he completed in 1819. He was surveyor of the Narmada valley in 1825, and surveyor in Malwa and Rajputana in 1826 and 1827.

== Himalayan exploration ==
During the surveys in the Himalayas he ascended heights previously believed to be inaccessible, and penetrated into Tibet as far as the frontier pickets of Chinese would allow. Our earliest notions of the geological structure and remains of the Himalayan ranges come from his work.

In 1817–18 Gerard, setting out from Sabathu, explored the Sutlej valley in the Himalayas with Dr. George Govan (1787–1865). In 1818 he and his brother James, in a two-month journey, crossed the Sutlej and followed the Spiti Valley to Shipki La.

In 1821 he performed the most important of his Himalayan journeys. Leaving Sabathu, he ascended the Himalayan upper ranges, carefully noting the places inhabited by the way, establishing height above sea level with a barometer, checked by trigonometrical measurements wherever practicable, and noting temperatures, natural productions, and character of the people in places previously supposed to be uninhabited and uninhabitable.

Gerard and his company reached the Borendo pass, 15,121 feet above the sea-level, on 15 June. The local guides refused to proceed further, and Gerard had to shape his course to the source of the Pabbar River by another route. The Charang pass, at an altitude of 17,348 feet, was ascended on 9 July, half a mile of the slope being so slippery with gravel and half-melted snow that Gerard had to crawl upwards on all fours, burying his arms deep in the snow to secure his hold.

The company ascended the Keobarang pass, altitude 18,312 feet; also Mount Tahigung, where part of the ascent was at an angle of forty-two degrees. The height ascended was 19,411 feet, and the total computed altitude of the mountain 22,000 feet. A small collection of geological specimens, made by Gerard in Chinese Tartary during this journey between latitude 31° 30′and 32° 30′ N. and longitude 77°–79° E., at altitude 19,000 feet, and resembling the fossils of the oolite in Europe, was exhibited at the Geological Society of London after his death.

== His character ==
Bishop Reginald Heber, who met Gerard at Umeerpore after his return from this journey, describes him as a man of very modest exterior and of great science and information, and enlarges eloquently in his journal on Gerard's achievements and enterprising spirit (Heber, Journal of a Journey in the Upper Provinces, ii. 59).

Gerard was a Persian scholar and versed in other oriental languages. He was an accurate topographer and an entertaining and observant traveller. Unfortunately, except for fragments, no accounts of his travels were published during his lifetime.

== Death ==
Broken health, the result of hardships endured in the course of his survey duties and travels, led to his retirement from the service on 22 February 1836, and brought him to a premature grave. He died in Aberdeen on 15 December 1839, aged 48, after three days' illness, from a fever, to the attacks of which he was periodically subject.

== Publications ==
The Geological Society of London compiled, from Sir Henry Thomas Colebrooke's selections from Gerard's geological notes on the Himalayas, and from Gerard's letters, the Geological Sketch of the Himalayas, which appeared in Geological Transactions (London), i. (2nd ser.) 124.

A narrative of Gerard's Journey from Subathoo to Shipké in Chinese Tartary appeared posthumously in Journal of the Asiatic Society of Bengal (1842), xi. 363–91, and his Journal of a Journey from Shipké to the frontier of Chinese Thibet was published in the Edinburgh Journal of Science (1824), i. 41–52, 215–225.

In 1840 Sir William Lloyd, a major in the Bengal infantry and Himalayan explorer, produced, under the editorship of his son, George Lloyd, Narrative of a Journey from Caunpoor to the Borendo Pass in the Himalayas, in two volumes (London, 1840). The second volume of this work consisted of the narratives of Alexander and James Gilbert Gerard, which were prepared for the purpose by Alexander, who died before publication of the work. Afterwards, Alexander Gerard's papers, or some of them, appear to have been entrusted to George Lloyd, who published from them An Account of Koonawar in the Himalayas, (London, 1841). To this account are appended narratives of Alexander Gerard's Himalayan journeys in 1817–18 and 1819.
