= Gilbert Gerard (theological writer) =

Scottish theological writer

Gilbert Gerard MA
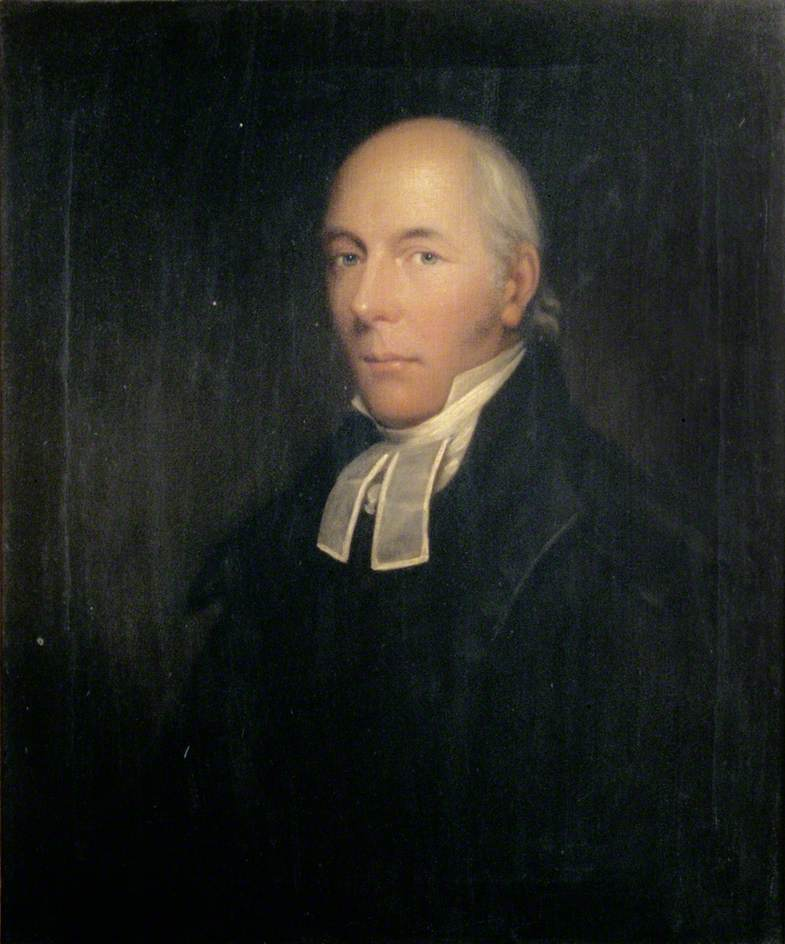
- Born: 12 August 1760
- Died: 28 September 1815 (aged 55)
- Spouse: Helen (m. 1787)
- Children: 11, including Alexander, James, Patrick
- Parent(s): Alexander Gerard, Jane Wight

Academic background
- Education: King's College, Aberdeen; University of Edinburgh

Gilbert Gerard (1760–1815) was a Scottish theological writer. He became the minister of the Scots Church, Amsterdam. He was professor of Greek at King's College, Aberdeen, 1791, and divinity, 1795. In 1803 he was Moderator of the General Assembly of the Church of Scotland.

== Life ==
Gerard was born in Aberdeen on 12 August 1760, son of Jane (d. 1818), the eldest daughter of Dr John Wight of Colnae, and the Very Rev Alexander Gerard. He studied at King's College, Aberdeen graduating with an MA in 1777, going on to study divinity at the University of Edinburgh. On being licensed he became a Church of Scotland minister of the Scots Church in Amsterdam, and during his time there studied modern languages and literature, contributing to the Analytical Review. In 1791 he returned to Aberdeen to take up the Chair of Greek in King's College.

On his father's death, in 1795, Gerard succeeded him in the Chair of Divinity, and in 1811 he added to his professorship the second charge in the collegiate church of Old Machar in north Aberdeen. He was a King's Chaplain, and was elected Moderator of the General Assembly of the Church of Scotland in 1803. He became second charge minister of Old Machar on 19 September 1811, and died 28 September 1815.

== Bibliography ==
- Institutes of Biblical Criticism (Edinburgh, 1808)
- Compendious View of the Evidences of Natural and Revealed Religion (1828) by Alexander and Gilbert Gerard, based on their divinity lectures.

== Family ==
On 3 October 1787, he married Helen, daughter of John Duncan, three times Provost of Aberdeen. The couple had five daughters and six sons. Three of the sons, Alexander, James Gilbert, and Patrick, were known as explorers in India.
