= William George Garrard =

New Zealand rugby union official and referee

William George "Gun" Garrard (1 July 1864 – 20 October 1944) was a New Zealand rugby union official and referee.

== Personal history ==
Garrard was born in London in 1864, but emigrated with his parents to New Zealand while still an infant. He was educated in Nelson and entered his father's gun-making business on leaving school. A keen sportsman, Garrard played rugby football from a young age and was a member of the Christchurch Amateur Athletic Club from 1885 to 1896. In his role with the Christchurch Club, he was a delegate to the New Zealand Amateur Athletic Association. Garrard was also a keen cricketer, representing a Midlands XI team. His younger brother Charles was a more notable cricketer, representing Canterbury in 13 first-class matches.

== Rugby career ==
Garrard was honorary secretary to the Canterbury Rugby Football Union and in 1899 he officiated his first international rugby match when he refereed the First Test between Australia and the British Isles during the team's 1899 tour.
