= Lynovytsia =

Rural locality in Chernihiv Oblast, Ukraine

Lynovytsia Линовиця
- Rural settlement
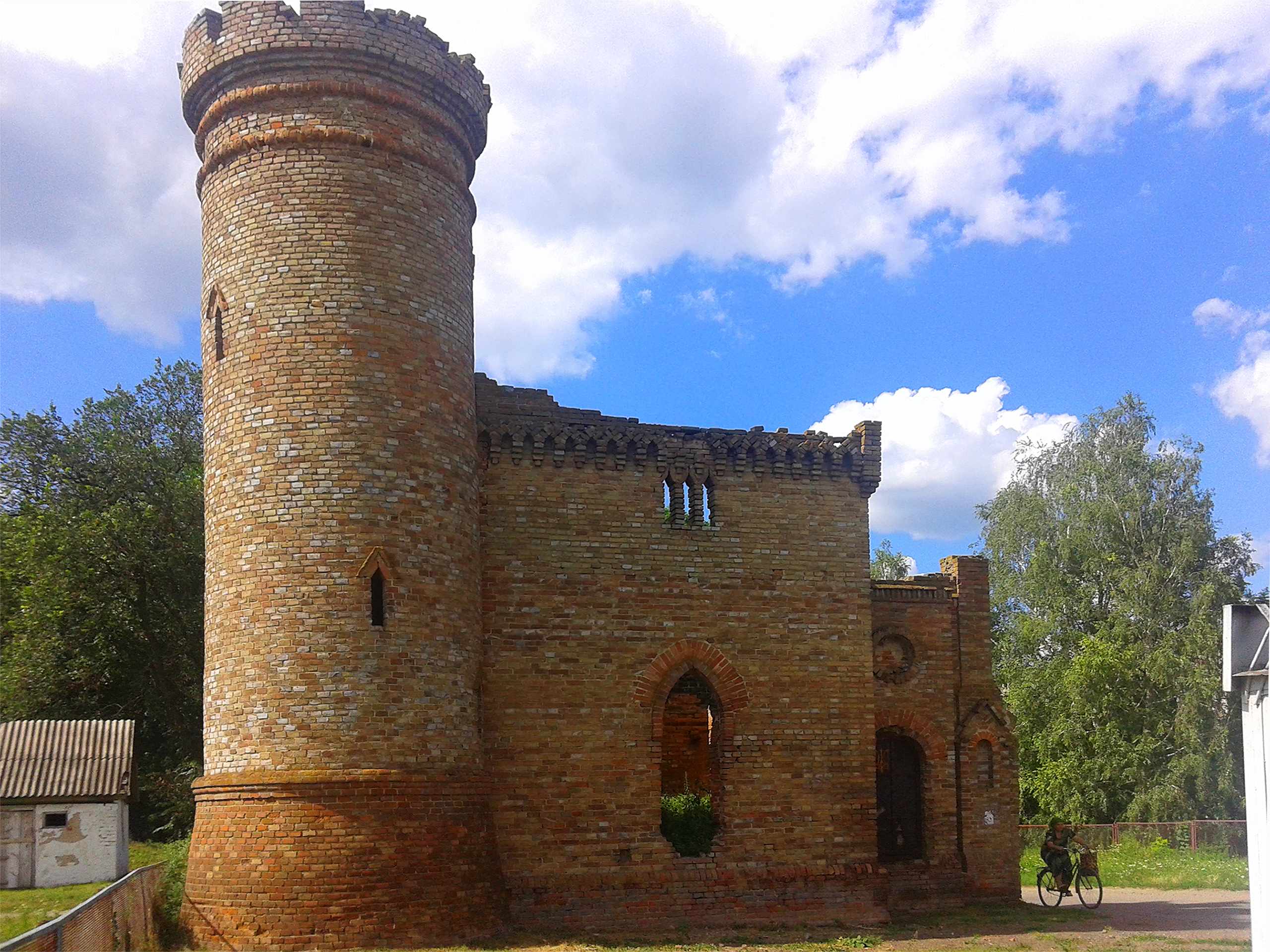
- Tower of the Count de Balman in Lynovytsia

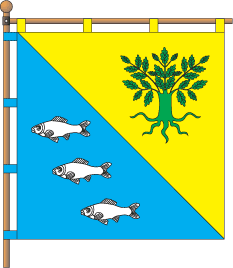
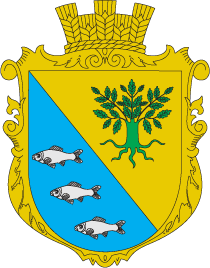
- Flag Coat of arms

- Location within Chernihiv Oblast Location within Ukraine
- Coordinates: 51°28′12″N 32°24′00″E
- Country: Ukraine
- Oblast: Chernihiv Oblast
- Raion: Pryluky Raion

Area
  - Total: 7.64 km^{2} (2.95 sq mi)

Population (2022)
  - Total: 2,574
  - Density: 337/km^{2} (873/sq mi)
- Time zone: UTC+2 (EET)
  - Summer (DST): UTC+3 (EEST)
- Postal code: 17584
- Area code: +380 4637
- Website: http://linovitsa-otg.gov.ua

Lynovytsia (Ukrainian: Линовиця) is a rural settlement in Pryluky Raion, Chernihiv Oblast, Ukraine. The Lynovytsia is located in the southern part of the Chernihiv Oblast, within the Dnieper Lowland. The village was first mentioned in 1629. It hosts the administration of Lynovytsia settlement hromada, one of the hromadas of Ukraine. The population is 2,574 (2022 estimate).

== History ==
The village was first mentioned in 1629, when a census was conducted. It was a settlement in Pyriatyn uyezd of Poltava Governorate of the Russian Empire. During World War II it was occupied by Axis troops between September 1941 and September 1943. Urban-type settlement since October 1960.

In 1972 there were a sugar plant, a bakery, one sovkhoz, two schools and a library. In January 1989, population was 3440 people. In January 2013, population was 2743 people.

Until 26 January 2024, Lynovytsia was designated urban-type settlement. On this day, a new law entered into force which abolished this status, and Lynovytsia became a rural settlement.

== Geography ==
The Lynovytsia is located in the southern part of the Chernihiv Oblast. The territory of the settlement is located within the Dnieper Lowland. A tributary of the Udai River (Sula basin) flows through the village, on which there are several ponds.

The climate of Lynovytsia is moderately continental, with warm summers and relatively mild winters. The average temperature in January is about -7 °C, and in July - +19 °C. The average annual precipitation ranges from 600 to 660 mm, with the highest amount of precipitation in the summer period.

The Lynovytsia is located in the natural zone of the forest steppe, in Polissya. The soil cover of the district is dominated by chernozem and podzolized soils.

== Economy ==
The basis of the Lynovytsia economy is agriculture and the food industry. The only sugar refinery in the Chernihiv region operates in Lynivitsy.

=== Transport ===
The regional highway R 67 (Chernihiv–Pryluky–Pyryatyn) passes through the Lynovytsia. The railway line Bakhmach–Hrebinka passes through Linovytsy.

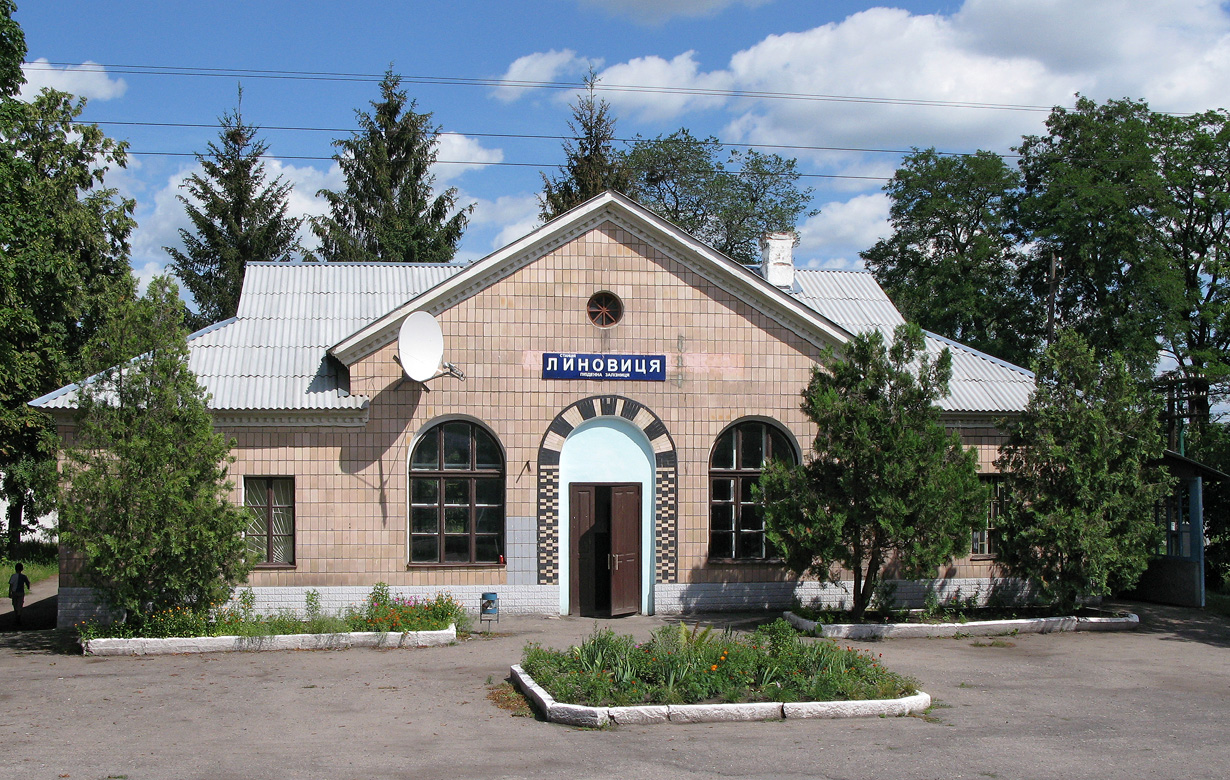
Train station
