= Mala Divytsia =

Rural locality in Chernihiv Oblast, Ukraine

Mala Divytsia Мала Дівиця
- Rural settlement
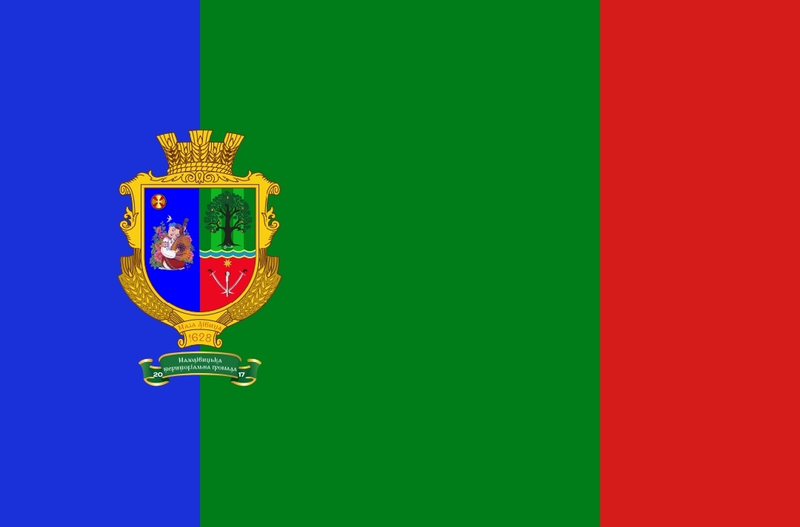
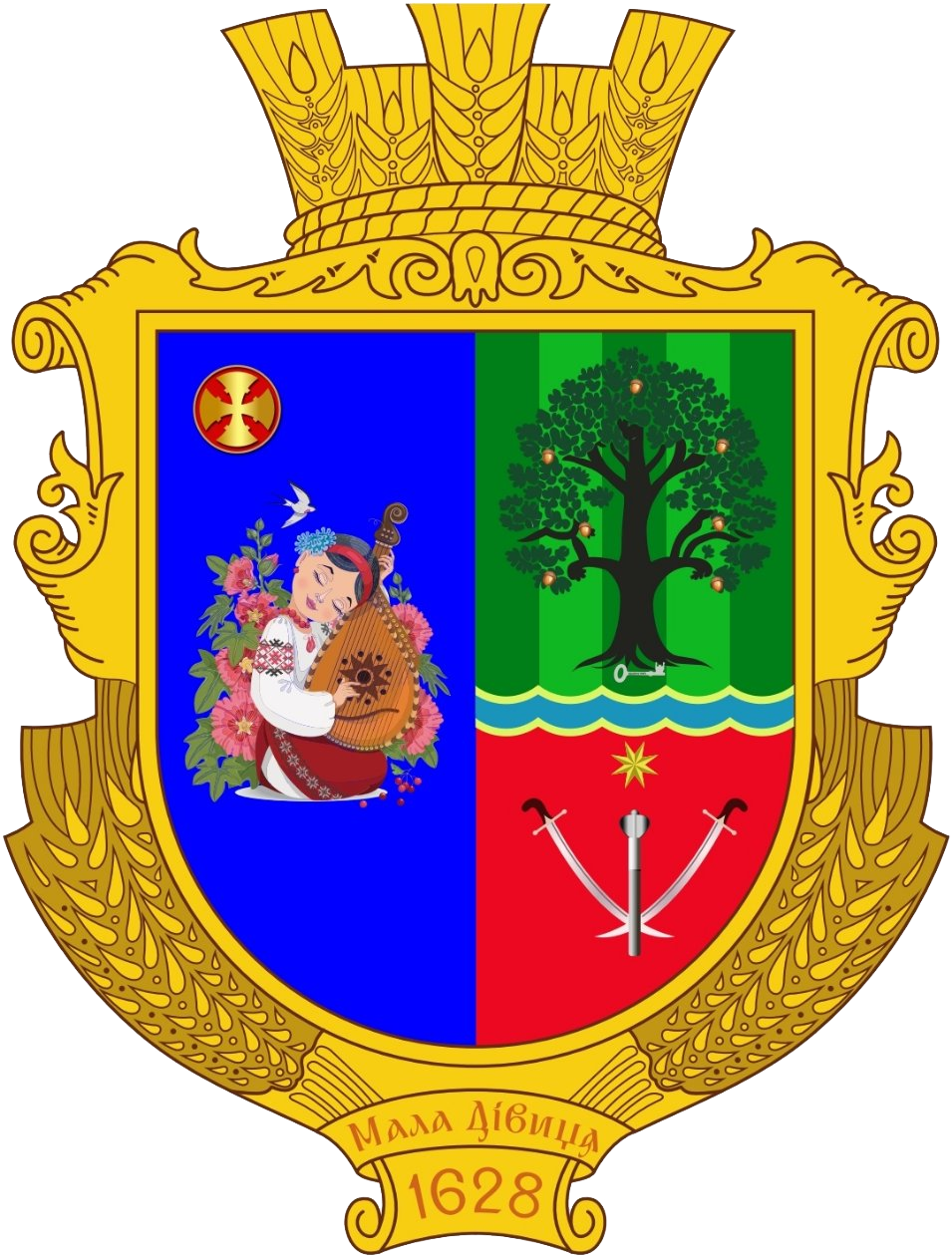
- Flag Coat of arms

- Location within Chernihiv Oblast Location within Ukraine
- Coordinates: 50°41′19″N 32°10′54″E
- Country: Ukraine
- Oblast: Chernihiv Oblast
- Raion: Pryluky Raion

Population (2024)
  - Total: 1,747
- Time zone: UTC+2 (EET)
  - Summer (DST): UTC+3 (EEST)

Mala Divytsia (Ukrainian: Мала Дівиця; Russian: Малая Девица) is a rural settlement in Pryluky Raion, Chernihiv Oblast, northern Ukraine. The Mala Divytsia is located in the south of Chernihiv Oblast, 20 km from Pryluky. Mala Divytsia is located on the banks of the Halka River, a left tributary of the Uday, close to its mouth. It hosts the administration of Mala Divytsia settlement hromada, one of the hromadas of Ukraine. Population: 1,931 (2022 estimate).

Until 26 January 2024, Mala Divytsia was designated urban-type settlement. On this day, a new law entered into force which abolished this status, and Mala Divytsia became a rural settlement.

== Geography ==
The Mala Divytsia is located in the south of Chernihiv Oblast, 20 km from Pryluky. The territory of the settlement located within the Dnieper Lowland. The relief of the settlement surface is a lowland plain. All rivers belong to the Dnieper basin. The Mala Divytsia is located on the left bank of the Udai (Sula basin), and there are ponds.

The climate of Mala Divytsia is moderately continental, with warm summers and relatively mild winters. The average temperature in January is about -7 °C, and in July - +19 °C. The average annual precipitation ranges from 550 to 660 mm, with the highest amount of precipitation in the summer period.

The soil cover of the settlement is dominated by chernozem and podzolized soils. The Mala Divytsia is located on the border of Polesia and the forest steppe. The main species in the forests are pine, oak, alder, ash, and birch.

== Economy ==
The leading sectors of the Mala Divytsia are agriculture, food industry, and forestry.

=== Transportation ===
Halka railway station on the line connecting Nizhyn and Pryluky is located in Mala Divytsia. There is some passenger traffic.

Mala Divytsia is next to P-67 road connecting Nizhyn and Pyriatyn via Pryluky. It also have access to H07 highway which connects Kyiv and Sumy.
