= Lynovytsia settlement hromada =

Lynovytsia settlement hromada Линовицька селищна громада
- Hromada
- Interactive map of Lynovytsia settlement hromada
- Country: Ukraine
- Oblast: Chernihiv
- Raion: Pryluky

Area
  - Total: 205.9 km^{2} (79.5 sq mi)

Population (2020)
  - Total: 4,685
  - Density: 22.75/km^{2} (58.93/sq mi)
- CATOTTG code: UA74080070000022285
- Settlements: 16
- Villages: 15
- Towns: 1
- Website: lynovycka-gromada.gov.ua

Lynovytsia settlement hromada (Ukrainian: Линовицька селищна громада) is a hromada of Ukraine, located in Pryluky Raion, Chernihiv Oblast. The Lynovytsia settlement hromada is located within the Dnieper Lowland, in Polissya. Its administrative center is the town of Lynovytsia.

It has an area of 205.9 square kilometres (79.5 mi^{2}) and a population of 4,685, as of 2020.

== Composition ==
The largest settlement in the hromada is the village of Lynovytsia, where almost 50% of the hromadas residents live. The Lynovytsia settlement hromada includes 16 settlements: 1 town (Lynovytsia) and 15 villages:

- Bohdanivka
- Bubnivshchyna
- Hlynshchyna
- Dankivka
- Lutaika
- Moklyaki
- Mohnivka
- Netyahivshchyna
- Nova Hreblya
- Onishchenkiv
- Polonka
- Stasivshchyna
- Topolya
- Turkivka
- Udaitsi

== Geography ==
The Lynovytsia territorial hromada is located in the southern part of the Chernihiv Oblast. The district borders on the Lubny Raion of Poltava Oblast. The territory of the Lynovytsia settlement hromada is located within the Dnieper Lowland. The relief of the hromadas surface is a lowland plain, in places dissected by river valleys. All rivers belong to the Dnieper basin. The largest river is the Udai, a tributary of the Sula, and there are many ponds..

The climate of Lynovytsia settlement hromada is moderately continental, with warm summers and relatively mild winters. The average temperature in January is about -7°C, and in July - +19°C. The average annual precipitation ranges from 600 to 660 mm, with the highest amount of precipitation in the summer period.

The Lynovytsia settlement hromada is located in the natural zone of the forest steppe, in Polissya. The vegetation cover of the hromada consists of meadow steppes, oak-hornbeam forests, floodplain meadows and lowland swamps. Forests make up 4% of the hromadas territory. The soil cover of the district is dominated by chernozem and podzolized soils. Minerals: peat, sand, clay.

== Economy ==
The basis of the hromadas economy is agriculture and the food industry. The only sugar refinery in the region operates in the Lynovytsia settlement hromada. The regional highway R 67 (Chernihiv–Pryluky–Pyryatyn) passes through the community. The railway station is located in Lynovytsia (Bakhmach–Hrebinka line).

== See also ==
- List of hromadas of Ukraine
