= Sukhopolova rural hromada =

Sukhopolova rural hromada Сухополов'янська сільська громада
- Hromada
- Interactive map of Sukhopolova rural hromada
- Country: Ukraine
- Oblast: Chernihiv
- Raion: Pryluky

Area
  - Total: 887.8 km^{2} (342.8 sq mi)

Population (2020)
  - Total: 12,598
  - Density: 14.19/km^{2} (36.75/sq mi)
- CATOTTG code: UA74080170000055617
- Settlements: 54
- Villages: 54
- Website: shp.gromada.org.ua

Sukhopolova rural hromada (Ukrainian: Сухополов'янська сільська громада) is a hromada of Ukraine, located in Pryluky Raion, Chernihiv Oblast. The Sukhopolova territorial hromada is located within the Dnieper Lowland. Its administrative center is the village of Sukhopolova.

It has an area of 887.8 square kilometres (342.8 mi^{2}) and a population of 12,598, as of 2020.

== Composition ==
The hromada contains 54 settlements, which are all villages:

- Bazhanivka
- Bileshchyna
- Bilorichitsa
- Borotba
- Borshna
- Valky
- Vysoke
- Hustynia
- Dymyrivka
- Didivtsi
- Yehorivka
- Zayzd
- Zamistya
- Zarudka
- Zaudaivske
- Znamianka
- Kanivshchyna
- Kapustentsi
- Kolisnyky
- Kroty
- Ladivshchyna
- Levky
- Lisove
- Lisovye Sorochyntsi
- Mazky
- Malkivka
- Manzhosivka
- Masivka
- Mykolaivka
- Milki
- Netiazhyno
- Nova Tarnavshchyna
- Onikiyivka
- Okhinky
- Perevolochna
- Petrivske
- Pirohivtsi
- Piddubivka
- Pohreby
- Pokrivka
- Polova
- Polohy
- Priozerne
- Pruchai
- Rudivka
- Ryashki
- Smosh
- Strelniki
- Sukhopolova
- Sukhostavets
- Sukhoyarivka
- Tarasivka
- Tyche
- Yarova Bileshchyna

== Geography ==
The Sukhopolova territorial hromada is located in the south of Chernihiv Oblast. The territory of the hromada is located within the Dnieper Lowland. The relief of the hromadas surface is a lowland plain, in places dissected by river valleys. The Udai (Sula basin) and its tributaries flow through the Sukhopolova hromada, and there are about 40 ponds.

The climate of Sukhopolova settlement hromada is moderately continental, with warm summers and relatively mild winters. The average temperature in January is about -7°C, and in July - +19°C. The average annual precipitation ranges from 550 to 660 mm, with the highest amount of precipitation in the summer period.

The soil cover of the Sukhopolova settlement hromada is dominated by chernozem and podzolized soils. The hromada is located the forest steppe, on the Polesia. The forest cover of the community is 11.5%. The main species in the forests are pine, oak, alder, ash, and birch. The Pryluky Dendrological Park with an area of 11.9 hectares is located on the territory of the hromada. Minerals: oil, gas and sand.

== Economy ==
The leading sectors of the hromadas economy are agriculture, mining and food industry.

=== Transportation ===
The national highway H07 Kyiv-Sumy-Yunakivka, the railway line Bakhmach-Pryluky, passes through the hromada.

== See also ==
- List of hromadas of Ukraine
