= Mala Divytsia settlement hromada =

Mala Divytsia settlement hromada Малодівицька селищна громада
- Hromada
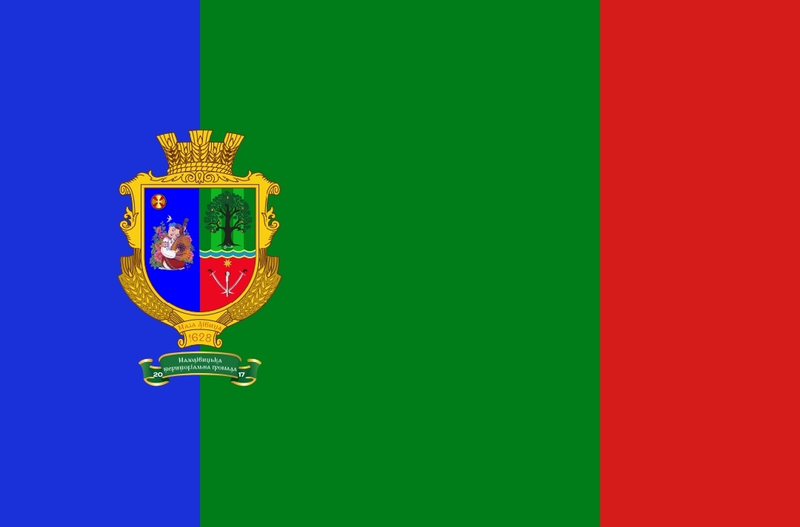
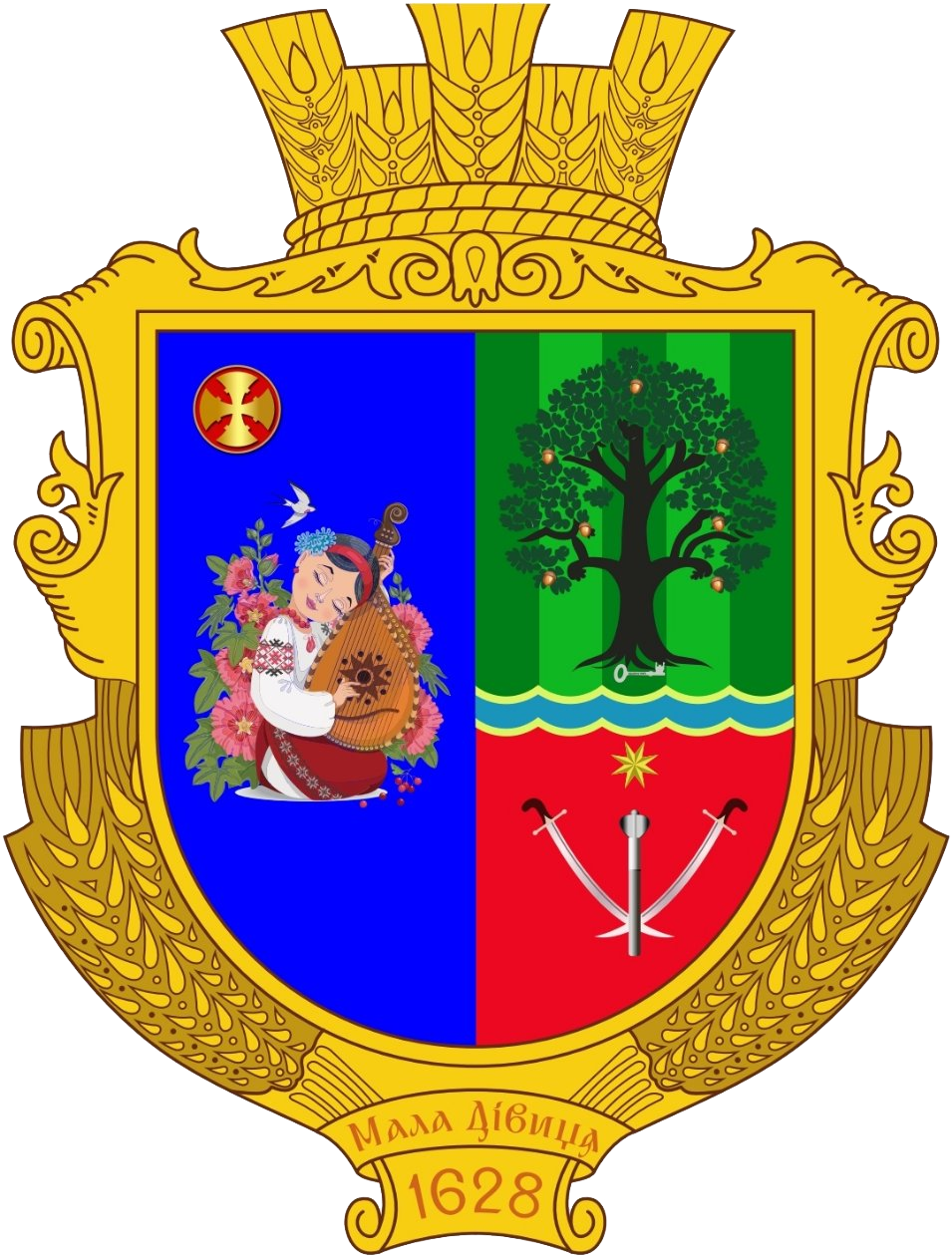
- Flag Coat of arms
- Interactive map of Mala Divytsia settlement hromada
- Country: Ukraine
- Oblast: Chernihiv
- Raion: Pryluky

Area
  - Total: 238.9 km^{2} (92.2 sq mi)

Population (2020)
  - Total: 4,468
  - Density: 18.70/km^{2} (48.44/sq mi)
- CATOTTG code: UA74080090000092409
- Settlements: 13
- Villages: 12
- Towns: 1
- Website: malodivycka.gromada.org.ua

Mala Divytsia settlement hromada (Ukrainian: Малодівицька селищна громада) is a hromada of Ukraine, located in Pryluky Raion, Chernihiv Oblast. The Mala Divytsia settlement hromada is located in the south of Chernihiv Oblast, within the Dnieper Lowland, on the border of Polesia and the forest steppe. Its administrative center is the town of Mala Divytsia.

It has an area of 238.9 square kilometres (92.2 mi^{2}) and a population of 4,468, as of 2020.

== Composition ==
The hromada includes 13 settlements: 1 town (Mala Divytsia) and 12 villages:

- Velika Divitsia
- Dmitrivka
- Zaudaika
- Kletsi
- Novy Lad
- Obychiv
- Pershe Travnia
- Petrivka
- Radkivka
- Svitankove
- Tovkachivka
- Shevchenko

== Geography ==
The Mala Divytsia settlement hromada is located in the south of Chernihiv Oblast. The hromada center is located 20 km from the district center of Pryluky. All settlements are located 7-9 km from the hromada center. The territory of the settlement hromadais located within the Dnieper Lowland. The relief of the hromadas surface is a lowland plain, in places dissected by river valleys. All rivers belong to the Dnieper basin. The largest river is the Udai, a tributary of the Sula, and there are 12 ponds.

The climate of Mala Divytsia settlement hromada is moderately continental, with warm summers and relatively mild winters. The average temperature in January is about -7°C, and in July - +19°C. The average annual precipitation ranges from 550 to 660 mm, with the highest amount of precipitation in the summer period.

The soil cover of the hromada is dominated by chernozem and podzolized soils. The Mala Divytsia settlement hromada is located on the border of Polesia and the forest steppe. The main species in the forests are pine, oak, alder, ash, and birch. Minerals: oil, gas, sand, clay.

On the territory of the village of Radkivka there is the Holy Ascension Church, which was founded in 1805.

== Economy ==
The leading sectors of the hromadas economy are agriculture, food industry, and forestry, and phosphate fertilizers are produced. Oil and gas production is carried out in the Mala Divytsia settlement. Oil and gas are produced at the Malodivitsky field.

=== Transportation ===
Regional highways pass through the Mala Divytsia settlement, in the south - state highway H07. The railway crosses the community in the middle, the railway junction is Galka.

== See also ==
- List of hromadas of Ukraine
