= Yablunivka rural hromada =

Yablunivka rural hromada Яблунівська сільська громада
- Hromada
- Interactive map of Yablunivka rural hromada
- Country: Ukraine
- Oblast: Chernihiv
- Raion: Pryluky

Area
  - Total: 282.9 km^{2} (109.2 sq mi)

Population (2020)
  - Total: 3,386
  - Density: 11.97/km^{2} (31.00/sq mi)
- CATOTTG code: UA74080210000098421
- Settlements: 9
- Villages: 9
- Website: yablunivka-gromada.gov.ua

Yablunivka rural hromada (Ukrainian: Яблунівська сільська громада) is a hromada of Ukraine, located in Pryluky Raion, Chernihiv Oblast. The territory of the Yablunivka rural hromada is located within the Dnieper Lowland, Udai basin. Its administrative center is the village of Yablunivka.

It has an area of 282.9 square kilometres (109.2 mi^{2}) and a population of 3,386, as of 2020.

== Composition ==
The hromada contains 9 settlements, which are all villages:

- Biloshapki
- Dubovy Hai
- Zaperevodske
- Kovtunivka
- Krutoyarivka
- Serhiivka
- Sukholisky
- Yablunivka
- Yablunivske

== Geography ==
The Yablunivka rural hromada is located in the southern part of the Chernihiv Oblast. The district borders on the Lubny Raion of Poltava Oblast and Brovarsky Raion Kyiv Oblast. The territory of the Yablunivka rural hromada is located within the Dnieper Lowland. The relief of the hromadas surface is a lowland plain, in places dissected by river valleys. All rivers belong to the Dnieper basin. The largest river is the Udai, a tributary of the Sula, and there are many ponds.

The climate of Yablunivka rural hromada is moderately continental, with warm summers and relatively mild winters. The average temperature in January is about -7°C, and in July - +19°C. The average annual precipitation ranges from 600 to 660 mm, with the highest amount of precipitation in the summer period.

The Yablunivka rural hromada is located in the natural zone of the forest steppe, in Polissya. The vegetation cover of the hromada consists of meadow steppes, oak-hornbeam forests, floodplain meadows and lowland swamps. The soil cover of the district is dominated by chernozem and podzolized soils.

== See also ==
- List of hromadas of Ukraine
