= Ladan settlement hromada =

Ladan settlement hromada Ладанська селищна громада
- Hromada
- Interactive map of Ladan settlement hromada
- Country: Ukraine
- Oblast: Chernihiv
- Raion: Pryluky

Area
  - Total: 179.2 km^{2} (69.2 sq mi)

Population (2020)
  - Total: 8,585
  - Density: 47.91/km^{2} (124.1/sq mi)
- CATOTTG code: UA74080050000033938
- Settlements: 7
- Villages: 6
- Towns: 1
- Website: ladanska-gromada.gov.ua

Ladan settlement hromada (Ukrainian: Ладанська селищна громада) is a hromada of Ukraine, located in Pryluky Raion, Chernihiv Oblast. The Ladan settlement hromada is located in the south of Pryluky Raion, within the Dnieper Lowland, on the Dnieper basin. Its administrative center is the town of Ladan.

It has an area of 179.2 square kilometres (69.2 mi^{2}) and a population of 8,585, as of 2020.

== Composition ==
The hromada includes 7 settlements: 1 town (Ladan) and 6 villages:

- Holubivka
- Ivkivtsi
- Kraslyany
- Lysky
- Podishche
- Rybtsi

== Geography ==
The Ladan settlement hromada is located in the south of Pryluky Raion. The hromada is located within the Dnieper Lowland. The relief of the district's surface is a lowland plain, in places dissected by river valleys. All rivers belong to the Dnieper basin. The largest river is the Udai, a tributary of the Sula.

The climate of Ladan settlement hromada is moderately continental, with warm summers and relatively mild winters. The average temperature in January is about -8°C, and in July - +19°C. The average annual precipitation ranges from 550 to 660 mm, with the highest amount of precipitation in the summer period.

The soil cover of the Ladan settlement hromada is dominated by chernozem and podzolized soils. The urban hromada is located in the natural zone of the forest steppe, in Polissya. The main species in the forests are pine, oak, alder, ash, and birch. The share of arable land in the community is approximately 40%, forests occupy 16% of the area. Minerals: peat, sand, clay.

== Economy ==
The leading sectors of the district's economy are agriculture, food industry, and forestry. Agriculture specializes in growing grain and industrial crops, cattle breeding, pig breeding and poultry farming. Mechanical engineering is represented by the production of special vehicles (fire engines).

=== Transportation ===
There is no railway connection in the territory of the Ladansk territorial community. The nearest railway station is in the city of Pryluky. A regional highway passes through the territory of the community.

== See also ==
- List of hromadas of Ukraine
