= Ladan, Chernihiv Oblast =

Rural locality in Chernihiv Oblast, Ukraine

Ladan Ладан
- Rural settlement
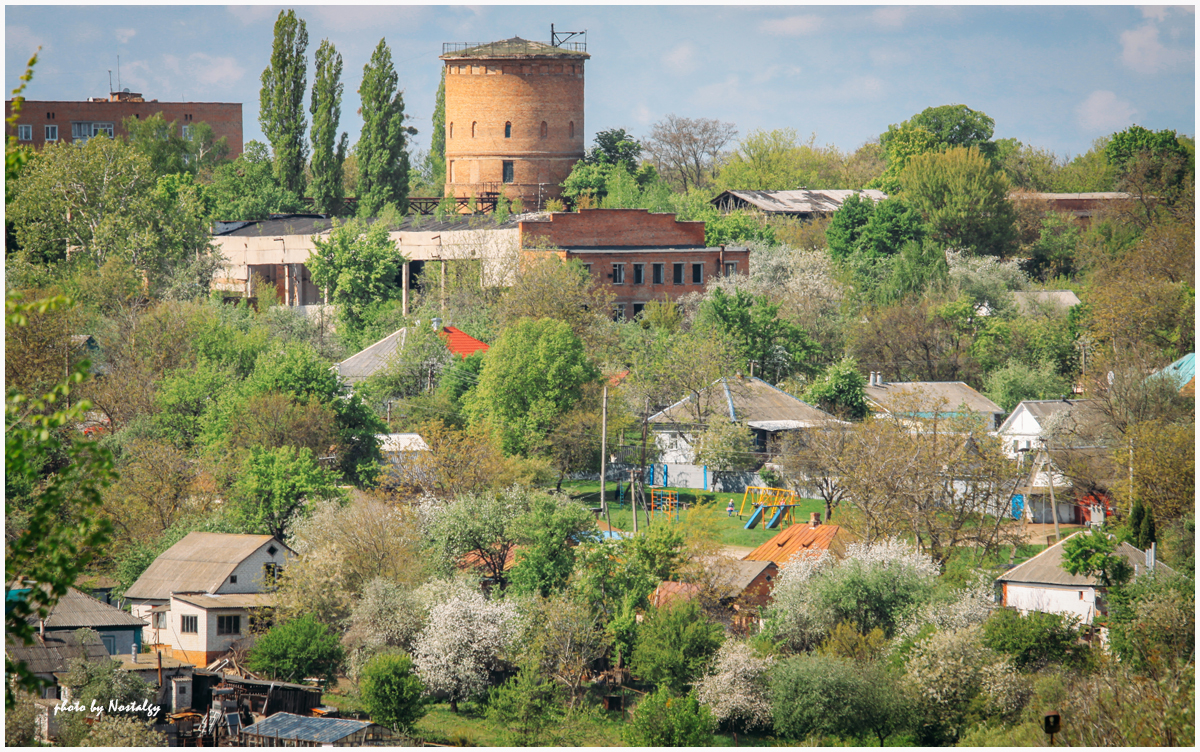

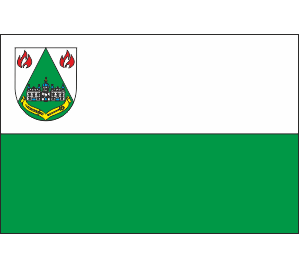
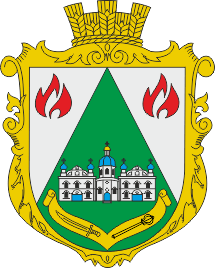
- Flag Coat of arms

- Location within Chernihiv Oblast Location within Ukraine
- Coordinates: 50°31′04″N 32°35′05″E
- Country: Ukraine
- Oblast: Chernihiv Oblast
- Raion: Pryluky Raion

Population (2022)
  - Total: 5,671 (2022 estimate).
- Time zone: UTC+2 (EET)
  - Summer (DST): UTC+3 (EEST)

Ladan (Ukrainian: Ладан; Russian: Ладан) is a rural settlement in Pryluky Raion, Chernihiv Oblast, northern Ukraine. It hosts the administration of Ladan settlement hromada, one of the hromadas of Ukraine. Ladan is located on the right bank of the Uday.Population: 4,921 (2024 estimate).

Until 26 January 2024, Ladan was designated urban-type settlement. On this day, a new law entered into force which abolished this status, and Ladan became a rural settlement.

== Geography ==
Ladan is located in the south of Pryluky Raion. The settlement is located within the Dnieper Lowland, on is the Udai, a tributary of the Sula.

The climate of Ladan is moderately continental, with warm summers and relatively mild winters. The average temperature in January is about -8 °C, and in July - +19 °C. The average annual precipitation ranges from 550 to 660 mm, with the highest amount of precipitation in the summer period.

The soil cover of the Ladan is dominated by chernozem and podzolized soils.The is settlement located in the natural zone of the forest steppe, in Polissya. The main species in the forests are pine, oak, alder, ash, and birch. Minerals: peat, sand, clay.

== Economy ==
The leading sectors of the village's economy are mechanical engineering, food processing, and forestry. The village is home to the only factory in the country that produces fire engines.

=== Transportation ===
A railway line connects Ladan with Pryluky, however, there is no passenger traffic. The closest passenger railway station is in Pryluky.

Ladan is on a local road connecting Pryluky and Sribne. At both ends it has access to H07 highway which connects Kyiv and Sumy.
