= Varva settlement hromada =

Varva settlement hromada Варвинська селищна громада
- Hromada
- Coat of arms
- Interactive map of Varva settlement hromada
- Country: Ukraine
- Oblast: Chernihiv
- Raion: Pryluky

Area
  - Total: 588.3 km^{2} (227.1 sq mi)

Population (2020)
  - Total: 14,908
  - Density: 25.34/km^{2} (65.63/sq mi)
- CATOTTG code: UA74080010000063011
- Settlements: 30
- Rural settlements: 2
- Villages: 27
- Towns: 1
- Website: varvynska-gromada.gov.ua

Varva settlement hromada (Ukrainian: Варвинська селищна громада) is a hromada of Ukraine, located in Pryluky Raion, Chernihiv Oblast. The territory of the Varva settlement hromada is located within the Dnieper Lowland, of the Sula basin. Its administrative center is the town of Varva.

It has an area of 588.3 square kilometres (227.1 mi^{2}) and a population of ▼15,610, as of 2025.

== Composition ==
The hromada includes 30 settlements: 1 town (Varva), 27 villages:

- Antonivka
- Berizka
- Bohdany
- Bokhaniv
- Brahyntsi
- Bulavivshchyna
- Voskresenske
- Hnidyntsi
- Hryhorivshchyna
- Dashchenki
- Zhuravka
- Kalinovitsa
- Kulishivka
- Kuharka
- Lelyaki
- Makiivka
- Makushikha
- Marmyzivka
- Mudre
- Ozeryany
- Ostapivka
- Svitlichne
- Sirikyv
- Siryakivshchyna
- Tonka
- Khortytsia
- Yashchenkov

And 2 rural-type settlements: Rubaniv and Saverske.

== Geography ==
The Varva settlement hromada is located in the southern part of the Chernihiv Oblast. The district borders on the Lubny and Myrhorod Raions of Poltava Oblast, Romensky Raion of Sumy Oblast. The territory of the Varva settlement hromada is located within the Dnieper Lowland. The relief of the hromadas surface is a lowland plain, in places dissected by river valleys. All rivers belong to the Dnieper basin. The largest river is the Udai, a tributary of the Sula, and there are many ponds.

The climate of Varva settlement hromada is moderately continental, with warm summers and relatively mild winters. The average temperature in January is about -7°C, and in July - +19°C. The average annual precipitation ranges from 600 to 660 mm, with the highest amount of precipitation in the summer period.

The Varva settlement hromada is located in the natural zone of the forest steppe, in Polissya. The vegetation cover of the hromada consists of meadow steppes, oak-hornbeam forests, floodplain meadows and lowland swamps. Forests make up 4% of the hromadas territory. The soil cover of the district is dominated by chernozem and podzolized soils. Minerals: peat, sand, clay.

== See also ==
- List of hromadas of Ukraine
