= Talalaivka =

Rural locality in Chernihiv Oblast, Ukraine

Talalaivka Талалаївка
- Rural settlement
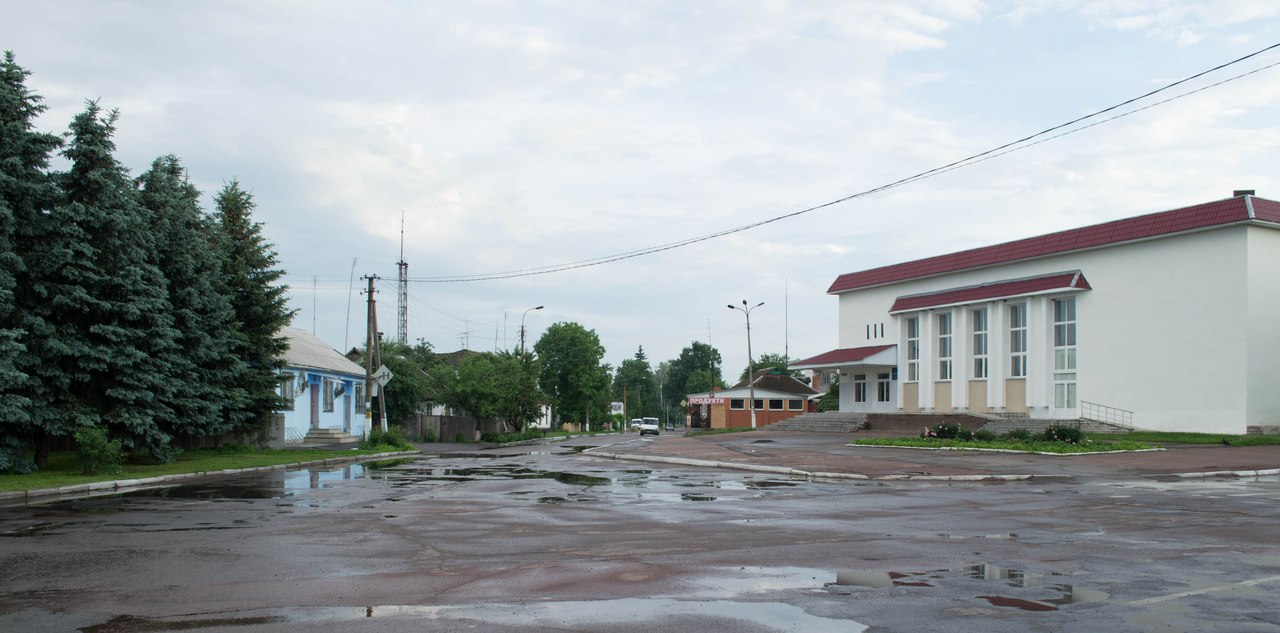

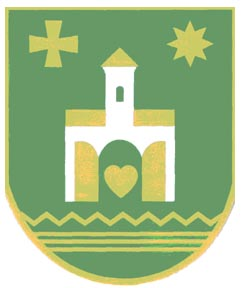
- Coat of arms

- Location of Talalayivka Talalaivka (Ukraine)
- Coordinates: 50°50′14″N 33°8′27″E
- Country: Ukraine
- Oblast: Chernihiv Oblast
- Raions: Pryluky Raion
- Established: 1877

Area
  - Total: 8.96 km^{2} (3.46 sq mi)

Population (2022)
  - Total: 4,562
  - Density: 509/km^{2} (1,320/sq mi)
- Postal code: 17200
- Area code: +380 4634

Talalaivka (Ukrainian: Талалáївка, Russian: Талалáевка) is a rural settlement in Pryluky Raion, Chernihiv Oblast (province) of northern Ukraine. The Talalaivka is located within the Dnieper Lowland, in the Sula basin, on the Polesia. It hosts the administration of Talalaivka settlement hromada, one of the hromadas of Ukraine. Population: 4,562 (2022 estimate).

== History ==
Until 18 July 2020, Talalaivka was the administrative center of Talalaivka Raion. The raion was abolished in July 2020 as part of the administrative reform of Ukraine, which reduced the number of raions of Chernihiv Oblast to five. The area of Talalaivka Raion was merged into Pryluky Raion.

Until 26 January 2024, Talalaivka was designated urban-type settlement. On this day, a new law entered into force which abolished this status, and Talalaivka became a rural settlement.

== Geography ==
The Talalaivka is located in the northeast of Pryluky Raion, on the border with the Romensky Raion of Sumy Oblast. The settlement is located 210 km from Chernihiv and 70 km from Pryluky. The territory of the Talalaivka is located within the Dnieper Lowland, in the Sula basin. The relief surface is a lowland plain, in places dissected by river valleys.

The climate of Talalaivka is moderately continental, with warm summers and relatively mild winters. The average temperature in January is about -7 °C, and in July - +19 °C. The average annual precipitation ranges from 550 to 660 mm, with the highest amount of precipitation in the summer period.

The soil cover of the Talalaivka is dominated by chernozem and podzolized soils. The settlement is located the forest steppe, on the Polesia. There are swamps and ponds in and around Talalaivka. Minerals: oil, gas and sand.

== Economy ==
The leading sectors of the hromadas economy are agriculture, mining and food industry.

=== Transportation ===
Regional roads and a railway pass through the village.
