= Talalaivka settlement hromada =

Talalaivka settlement hromada Талалаївська селищна громада
- Hromada
- Interactive map of Talalaivka settlement hromada
- Country: Ukraine
- Oblast: Chernihiv
- Raion: Pryluky

Area
  - Total: 632.5 km^{2} (244.2 sq mi)

Population (2020)
  - Total: 11,777
  - Density: 18.62/km^{2} (48.22/sq mi)
- CATOTTG code: UA74080190000091939
- Settlements: 45
- Rural settlements: 2
- Villages: 42
- Towns: 1
- Website: talgromada.gov.ua

Talalaivka settlement hromada (Ukrainian: Талалаївська селищна громада) is a hromada of Ukraine, located in Pryluky Raion, Chernihiv Oblast. Its administrative center is the town of Talalaivka.

It has an area of 632.5 square kilometres (244.2 mi^{2}) and a population of 11,777, as of 2020.

== Composition ==
The hromada includes 45 settlements: 1 town (Talalaivka), 42 villages:

- Berezivka
- Berezovitsa
- Bolotnytsia
- Hlyboke
- Hlynske
- Hrabshchyna
- Hrytsivka
- Dibrova
- Dovhalivka
- Zholobok
- Zaymishche
- Kolyadyn
- Korinetske
- Krasny Kolyadyn
- Lavirkove
- Levivshchyna
- Lypove
- Makarenkove
- Myhuriv
- Myrne
- Nova
- Novopetrivske
- Novoselivka
- Obukhove
- Petkiv
- Pluhatar
- Ponory
- Popovichka
- Rubaniv
- Ryabukhy
- Skorohodove
- Slobidka
- Spivakovo
- Stara Talalaivka
- Stepne
- Stepanivske
- Stepove
- Ukrainka
- Kharkiv
- Chernetske
- Shevchenko
- Yurkivtsi

And 2 rural-type settlements: Zeleny Hai and Osnova.

== Geography ==
The Talalaivka settlement hromada is located in the northeast of Pryluky Raion. The hromada borders on the Romensky and Konotop Raions of Sumy Oblast. The administrative center of the hromada, the village of Talalaivka, is located 210 km from Chernihiv and 70 km from Pryluky. The territory of the hromada is located within the Dnieper Lowland. The relief of the hromadas surface is a lowland plain, in places dissected by river valleys. The Udai (Sula basin) and its tributaries flow through the Talalaivka settlement hromada, and there are many ponds.There are 32 artesian wells operating in the hromada, which provide water to the population and businesses.

The climate of Talalaivka settlement hromada is moderately continental, with warm summers and relatively mild winters. The average temperature in January is about -7°C, and in July - +19°C. The average annual precipitation ranges from 550 to 660 mm, with the highest amount of precipitation in the summer period.

The soil cover of the Talalaivka settlement hromada is dominated by chernozem and podzolized soils. The hromada is located the forest steppe, on the Polesia. The forest cover of the community is 10,79%. The main species in the forests are pine, oak, alder, ash, and birch. Minerals: oil, gas and sand.

== Economy ==
The leading sectors of the hromadas economy are agriculture, mining and food industry.

=== Transportation ===
The national highway H07 (Kyiv-Sumy-Yunakivka) and the railway pass through the hromada. The railway stations are located in Talalaivka and Bolotnytsia.

== See also ==
- List of hromadas of Ukraine
