= Pryluky Raion =

Subdivision of Chernihiv Oblast, Ukraine

Pryluky Raion Прилуцький район
- Raion
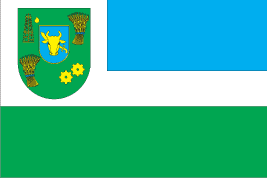
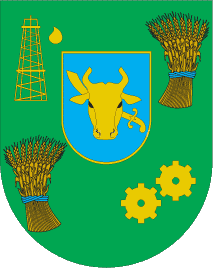
- Flag Coat of arms

- Pryluky Raion in Chernihiv Oblast
- Coordinates: 50°33′38″N 32°18′33″E
- Country: Ukraine
- Oblast: Chernihiv Oblast
- Admin. center: Pryluky
- Subdivisions: 11 hromadas

Area
  - Total: 1,800 km^{2} (690 sq mi)

Population (2022)
  - Total: 149,401
  - Density: 83/km^{2} (210/sq mi)
- Time zone: UTC+2 (EET)
  - Summer (DST): UTC+3 (EEST)
- Website: http://pladm.cg.gov.ua/

Pryluky Raion (Ukrainian: Прилуцький район) is a raion (district) of Chernihiv Oblast, northern Ukraine. Its administrative centre is located at the city of Pryluky. Population: 149,401 (2022 estimate).

On 18 July 2020, as part of the administrative reform of Ukraine, the number of raions of Chernihiv Oblast was reduced to five, and the area of Pryluky Raion was significantly expanded. Four abolished raions, Ichnia, Sribne, Talalaivka, and Varva Raions, as well as the city of Pryluky, which was previously incorporated as a city of oblast significance and did not belong to the raion, were merged into Pryluky Raion. The January 2020 estimate of the raion population was 34,406 (2020 est.).

== Subdivisions ==
=== Current ===
There are 279 settlements in the Pryluky Raion. After the reform in July 2020, the raion consisted of 11 hromadas:

- Ichnia urban hromada with the administration in the city of Ichnia, transferred from Ichnia Raion;
- Ladan settlement hromada with the administration in the rural settlement of Ladan, retained from Pryluky Raion;
- Lynovytsia settlement hromada with the administration in the rural settlement of Lynovytsia, retained from Pryluky Raion;
- Mala Divytsia settlement hromada with the administration in the rural settlement of Mala Divytsia, retained from Pryluky Raion;
- Parafiivka settlement hromada with the administration in the rural settlement of Parafiivka, transferred from Ichnia Raion;
- Pryluky urban hromada with the administration in the city of Pryluky, was previously a city of oblast significance;
- Sribne settlement hromada with the administration in the rural settlement of Sribne, transferred from Sribne Raion;
- Sukhopolova rural hromada, with the administration in the selo of Sukhopolova, retained from Pryluky Raion;
- Talalaivka settlement hromada with the administration in the rural settlement of Talalaivka, transferred from Talalaivka Raion;
- Varva settlement hromada with the administration in the rural settlement of Varva, transferred from Varva Raion;
- Yablunivka rural hromada with the administration in the selo of Yablunivka, retained from Pryluky Raion.

=== Before 2020 ===
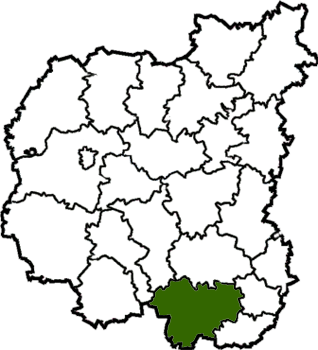
Pryluky Raion in Chernihiv Oblast before 2020

Before the 2020 reform, the raion consisted of five hromadas:

- Ladan settlement hromada with the administration in Ladan;
- Lynovytsia settlement hromada with the administration in Lynovytsia;
- Mala Divytsia settlement hromada with the administration in Mala Divytsia;
- Sukhopolova rural hromada with the administration in Sukhopolova;
- Yablunivka rural hromada with the administration in Yablunivka.

== Geography ==
The Pryluky Raion is located in the south of Chernihiv Oblast. The district borders on the Brovarsky and Boryspil Raions Kyiv Oblast, Lubny and Myrhorod Raions of Poltava Oblast, Romensky and Konotop Raions of Sumy Oblast, Nizhyn Raion of Chernihiv Oblast.

The territory of the Pryluky Raion is located within the Dnieper Lowland. The relief of the district's surface is a lowland plain, in places dissected by river valleys. All rivers belong to the Dnieper basin. The largest river is the Udai, a tributary of the Sula.

The climate of Pryluky Raion is moderately continental, with warm summers and relatively mild winters. The average temperature in January is about -7°C, and in July - +19°C. The average annual precipitation ranges from 550 to 660 mm, with the highest amount of precipitation in the summer period.

The soil cover of the district is dominated by chernozem and podzolized soils. The Pryluky Raion is located in the natural zone of the forest-steppe, in Polissya. The main species in the forests are pine, oak, alder, ash, and birch. Minerals: oil, peat, bischofite, gas, sand, clay.

== Economy ==
The leading sectors of the district's economy are agriculture, mining, food industry, automotive and forestry. Agriculture specializes in growing grain and industrial crops, cattle breeding, pig breeding and poultry farming. Oil and gas production is carried out in the district. Mechanical engineering is represented by the production of special vehicles (fire engines).

=== Transportation ===
The Chernihiv-Hrebinka, Pryluky- Bakhmach railways, regional highways and the M01 Derkhav highway pass through the Pryluky Raion. The main railway station is located in Pryluky.
