= Varva, Chernihiv Oblast =

Rural settlement in Chernihiv Oblast, Ukraine

Varva Варва
- Rural settlement
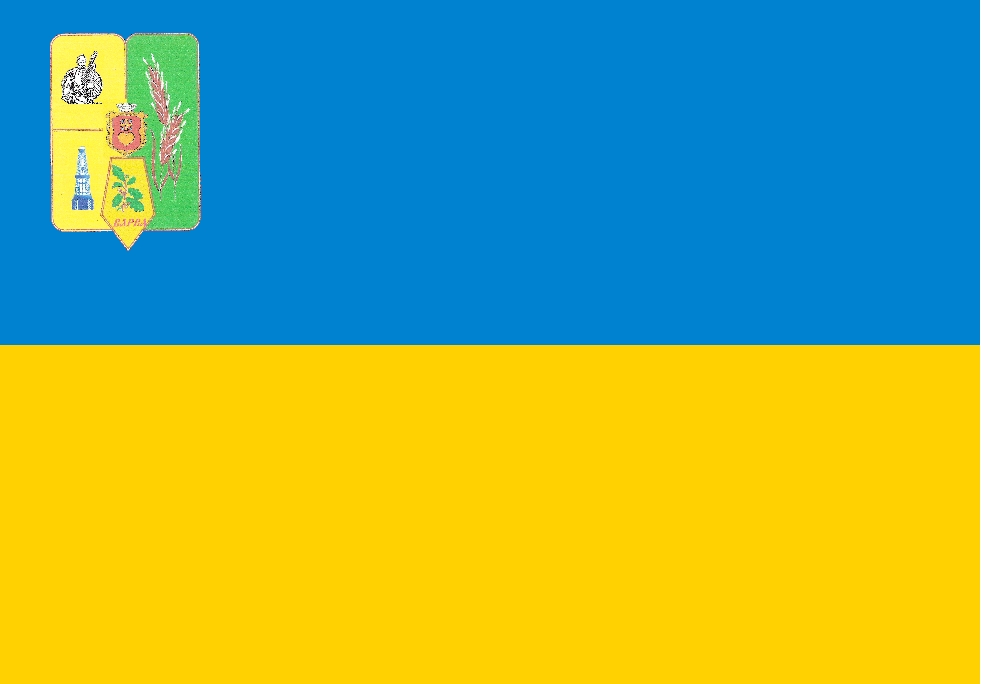
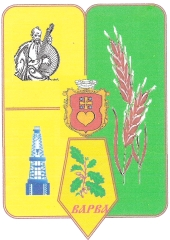
- Flag Coat of arms

- Location of Varva Varva (Ukraine)
- Coordinates: 50°29′42″N 32°43′25″E
- Country Oblast Raion: Ukraine; Chernihiv Oblast; Pryluky Raion
- First mentioned: 1079
- Rayon Center: 1960

Government
  - Mayor: Pavlo Skudnyi

Population (2022)
  - Total: 7,581
- Postal code: 17600
- Area code: + 380 4636
- Website: None

Varva (Ukrainian: Варва) is a rural settlement in Pryluky Raion, Chernihiv Oblast, Ukraine. It hosts the administration of Varva settlement hromada, one of the hromadas of Ukraine. Population: 7,581 (2022 estimate).

== History ==
Varva was founded at the site of an ancient settlement called Varyn which was referenced in 1079 within the "Instructions of Vladimir Monomakh", which was apparently the name of the village. On the site of the village, Monomakh defeated an army of Cumans.

The town's territory was later abandoned, and eventually became part of Lithuania and Poland. Varva was reestablished in 1658 and later served as a sotnia town, which had Magdeburg rights. In the 17th century. population of the town was approximately 6,500 people, with about 200 being Cossack.

During the famine of 1932-1933 called the Holodomor about 350 people were killed in the area with another 104 people suffering other punishments under the Stalin regime throughout the late 1930s.

On February 27, 1943, the village was the center for an anti-fascist uprising, during the time of the Nazi occupation of Ukraine however this small uprising only extended existed within two Oblasts, Chernihiv and Dnipropetrovsk.

During World War II, Varva was temporarily occupied by Nazi forces from September 17, 1941, until September 17, 1943. After the February 27, 1943 anti-fascist uprising, the participants formed guerilla groups to resist the occupying force from March 1943 until the end of the war.

During the later part of the 1960s the discovery of oil and gas in the Varva Raion contributed to the successful socio-economic development of the whole region.

Until 18 July 2020, Varva was the administrative center of Varva Raion. The raion was abolished in July 2020 as part of the administrative reform of Ukraine, which reduced the number of raions of Chernihiv Oblast to five. The area of Varva Raion was merged into Pryluky Raion.

Until 26 January 2024, Varva was designated urban-type settlement. On this day, a new law entered into force which abolished this status, and Varva became a rural settlement.

== Geography ==
Varva is located in the southeast part of Chernihiv, on the southern Poltava plains. Basically the entire area is a smooth, flat surface, sometimes dissected with passable valleys, gullies and ravines. The climate is continental with an average January temperature of 10 degrees and a summer July temperature of 25. The annual precipitation is about 550 mm, the snow cover is 15–20 cm and lasts about 100 days.

Soils in the area are predominantly black (84% of the area), there are some places where the group is composed of chernozem, peat and saline. The area contain 6,000 hectares of forest (growing mostly oak, maple, birch, linden, alder, aspen, pine).

Varva altitude - 153 meters (501.969 ft) above sea level.

Varva is located on the left bank of the river Udai, which has a length of 327 km and is a tributary of Sula. There are two artificial reservoirs in the settlement.

== Demographics ==
The area is populated by ethnic Ukrainians, Russians, Belarusians, Tatars and others.

1. Ethnic groups:

- Ukrainian: 94%; 7,809 people
- Russians: 4%; 332 people
- Belarusians: 0.7%; 58 people
- Tatars: 0.06%, 5 people
- Others: 1.24%, 103 people

2. Employment status:

- Employed: 4,106 people
- Unemployed: 2,625 people
- Unemployed including pensioners: 4,201 people

3. Age Range:

- Children under 18: 1,938
- Aged 18-35: 1,532
- Aged 36 to 59: 2,469
- 60 and older: 2,395

4. Religion:

Orthodox (Ukrainian Orthodox Church, the Ukrainian Orthodox Church Kyiv Patriarchate) and adherents of other churches: Evangelical Christians-Baptists, Seventh Day Adventists and others.

*The above data has reporting gaps where not all the population is represented.

== Economy ==
Varva was known in the second half of the twentieth century for its oil and gas reserves that have been commercially explored in the past.

Currently there are two major employers within the town. First is a gas processing plant, Hnidyntsivsky Gas, which has been in operation for several decades and currently employs about two-thousand people. Second is the JV Agricultural Enterprise, "Druzhba-Nova", which includes the company "Kernal" and collectively employs another two-thousand people.

== Culture ==
There are several catering and private bars in Varva, and while tourism is not well developed, there are several hiking trails around and throughout the city.

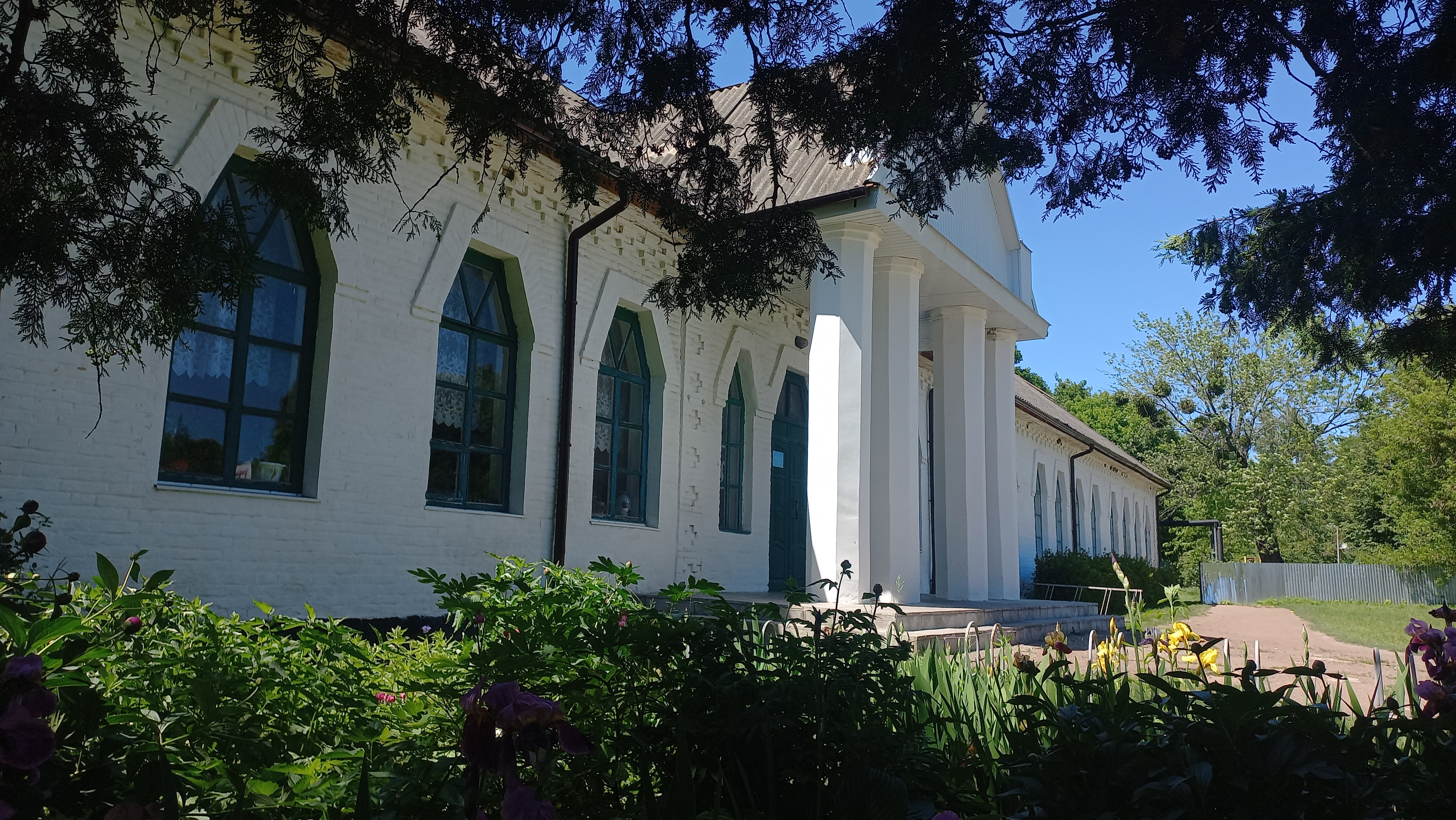
Four-room Zemstvo school, Varva (project of Opanas Slastion)

In Varva, there is a community school (zemstvo school) built in 1912, which contains characteristic features of Ukrainian architectural modernism. (Architect: Opanas Slastion) The school building has decorative large cornices and ornaments, trapezoidal windows and doors. The school is designed for 200 students, who can be taught in four classrooms.

Each year on the 17th of September, there is a "village day", where traditionally a fair is held, where residents participate in collective art shows.

In the center of the village square is a "Fairy-tale Village", made in 1924, with gazebos, children's playgrounds, a place of registration for special town events and several memorial signs.

Along 'Peace Street' is the Park of Glory, made in 1967, which has the Obelisk of Glory, Alley of Glory and several memorials.

== Infrastructure ==
Varva is an urban-type settlement which is located 200 km from the regional center, Chernihiv and 35 km from the railway station in Pryluky. The only transportation system is over its roads both domestic and long distance.

Today Varva has 49 multi-storey buildings, 93 streets and alleys, 1856 residential buildings and 1810 individual households.

The settlement has two artificial reservoirs, called Reservoir 1 and 2.

== Notable people ==
- Osip Bodyansky
- Alla Ghilenko (born 1992), Moldovan biathlete
- Mykola Mykhaylenko
- Denys Nahnoynyi
- Alexey Voyevoda (born 1980), Russian bobsledder, armwrestler and politician
