= Andriy Simonov =

Head of Pyriatyn City Council

- Official portrait, 2022

Mayor of Pyriatyn
- Incumbent
- Assumed office 25 October 2020

Personal details
- Born: Andriy Viktorovych Simonov; 13 November 1981 (age 44) Lebedyn, Sumy Oblast, Ukrainian SSR
- Party: All-Ukrainian Association "Batkivshchyna"
- Education: Ukrainian State University of Finance and International Trade

Andriy Viktorovych Simonov (born 13 November 1981) is a Ukrainian politician, lawyer, and mayor of Pyriatyn (since October 25, 2020).

== Biography ==
=== Education ===
- Graduated from Pyriatyn Secondary School in 1998 with honors.
- Graduated from the Ukrainian Academy of Foreign Trade under the Ministry of Economy of Ukraine in 2004 with a master's degree in international law with honors.
- Graduated from the Kyiv National University of Trade and Economics in 2020 with a master's degree in Business Administration.

=== Work activity ===
He founded the private enterprise "Udacha" in 2000.

In 2004, he became an assistant consultant to the People's Deputy of Ukraine in the apparatus of the Verkhovna Rada of Ukraine.

From 2004 to 2010 he worked as a senior lecturer at the Department of Foreign Languages and International Law of the Ukrainian Academy of Foreign Trade.

From 2006 to 2010, he worked as the head of the Pyriatyn branch of the Lubny United State Tax Inspectorate.

Since 2006, he has been a member of the Ukrainian Bar Association.

From 2008 to 2010, he was the head of UkrInterTrade, a private enterprise.

In 2009, he founded Kryachkivka-Agro Limited Liability Company and became deputy director.

In 2009, he co-founded the private enterprise Kryachkivka-Agro-Plus.

From 2010 to 2020, he worked as the head of the private enterprise Kriachkivka-Agro-Plus.

From 2010 to 2015, he was a member of the Pyriatyn District Council.

In 2015, he founded Agro-Service 2015 Limited Liability Company and Berezova Rudka-Agro Limited Liability Company.

Since October 25, 2020, he has been the Mayor of Pyriatyn City Council.
