= Omar aga =

Military leader

Omar aga was a military leader of the Tatars in what is today Ukraine.

As an elderly man, in 1643 he was a leader on the expedition on estates of Prince Jeremi Wiśniowiecki. When he was returning to Crimea, he was attacked and defeated by Wiśniowiecki at the Sula River.

His two sons accompanied him on the expedition. The older son, Bajraz Kazi, died a few days after the battle due to injuries.

== Bibliography ==
- Horn, Maurucy (1962). "Chronologia i zasięg najazdów tatarskich na ziemie Rzeczypospolitej w latach 1600—1647". Studia i materialy do historii wojskowości. 8 (1): 63.
- Serczyk, Władysław A. (1998). Na płonącej Ukrainie. Dzieje Kozaczyzny 1648-1651. Warszawa: Książka i Wiedza. p. 15.
