= Talalaivka Raion =

Former subdivision of Chernihiv Oblast, Ukraine

Talalaivka Raion Талалаївський район
- Raion
- Flag Coat of arms

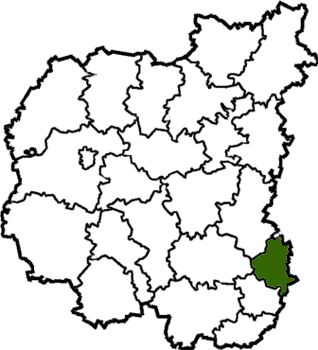
- Raion location in Chernihiv Oblast
- Coordinates: 50°49′45″N 33°2′34″E
- Country: Ukraine
- Oblast: Chernihiv Oblast
- Disestablished: 18 July 2020
- Admin. center: Talalayivka

Area
  - Total: 633 km^{2} (244 sq mi)

Population (2020)
  - Total: 12,065
  - Density: 19.1/km^{2} (49.4/sq mi)
- Time zone: UTC+2 (EET)
  - Summer (DST): UTC+3 (EEST)
- Website: http://taladm.cg.gov.ua/

Talalaivka Raion (Ukrainian: Талалаївський район) was a raion (district) of Chernihiv Oblast, northern Ukraine. Its administrative centre was located at the urban-type settlement of Talalaivka. The raion was abolished on 18 July 2020 as part of the administrative reform of Ukraine, which reduced the number of raions of Chernihiv Oblast to five. The area of Talalaivka Raion was merged into Pryluky Raion. The last estimate of the raion population was 12,065 (2020 est.)

At the time of disestablishment, the raion consisted of one hromada, Talalaivka settlement hromada with the administration in Talalaivka.
