= Pyriatyn National Nature Park =

National park in Ukraine

- Ukrainian: Пирятинський національний природний парк
- IUCN category II (national park)
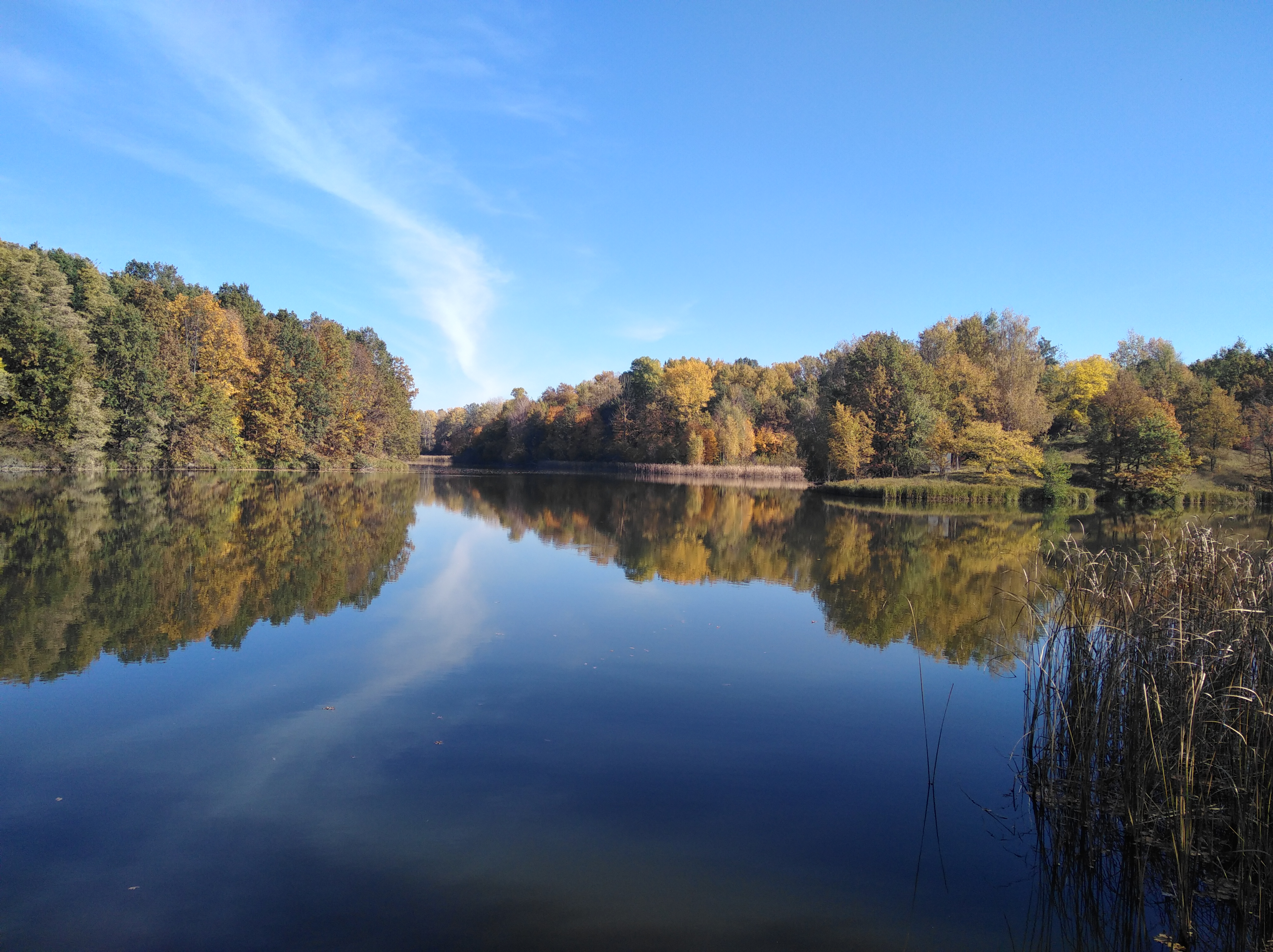
- Pyriatyn National Nature Park

- Location within Ukraine
- Location: Poltava Oblast
- Nearest city: Pyriatyn
- Coordinates: 50.23611111°N 32.50111111°E
- Area: 12,028.4 hectares (29,723 acres; 120 km^{2}; 46 sq mi)
- Established: 2009
- Governing body: Ministry of Ecology and Natural Resources (Ukraine)
- Website: http://www.npp-p.org.ua/

The Pyriatyn National Nature Park (Ukrainian: Пирятинський національний природний парк) is a national park of Ukraine that covers a portion of the Udai River valley in the north central part of the country. It provides nature conservation and recreation on the terraces and floodplains of the river. The park is about 130 km east of Kyiv, and is located close to Pyriatyn in Poltava Oblast.

== Topography ==
The park's borders form in clusters of territory strung along the Uday River, a tributary of the Dnieper River. The sectors are sometimes separated by up to 1 km, and the river runs from northwest to southeast in this area. The terrain is typical of river valleys in the East European Plain, with forest-steppe character on the slopes and wetlands on the floodplains and terraces.

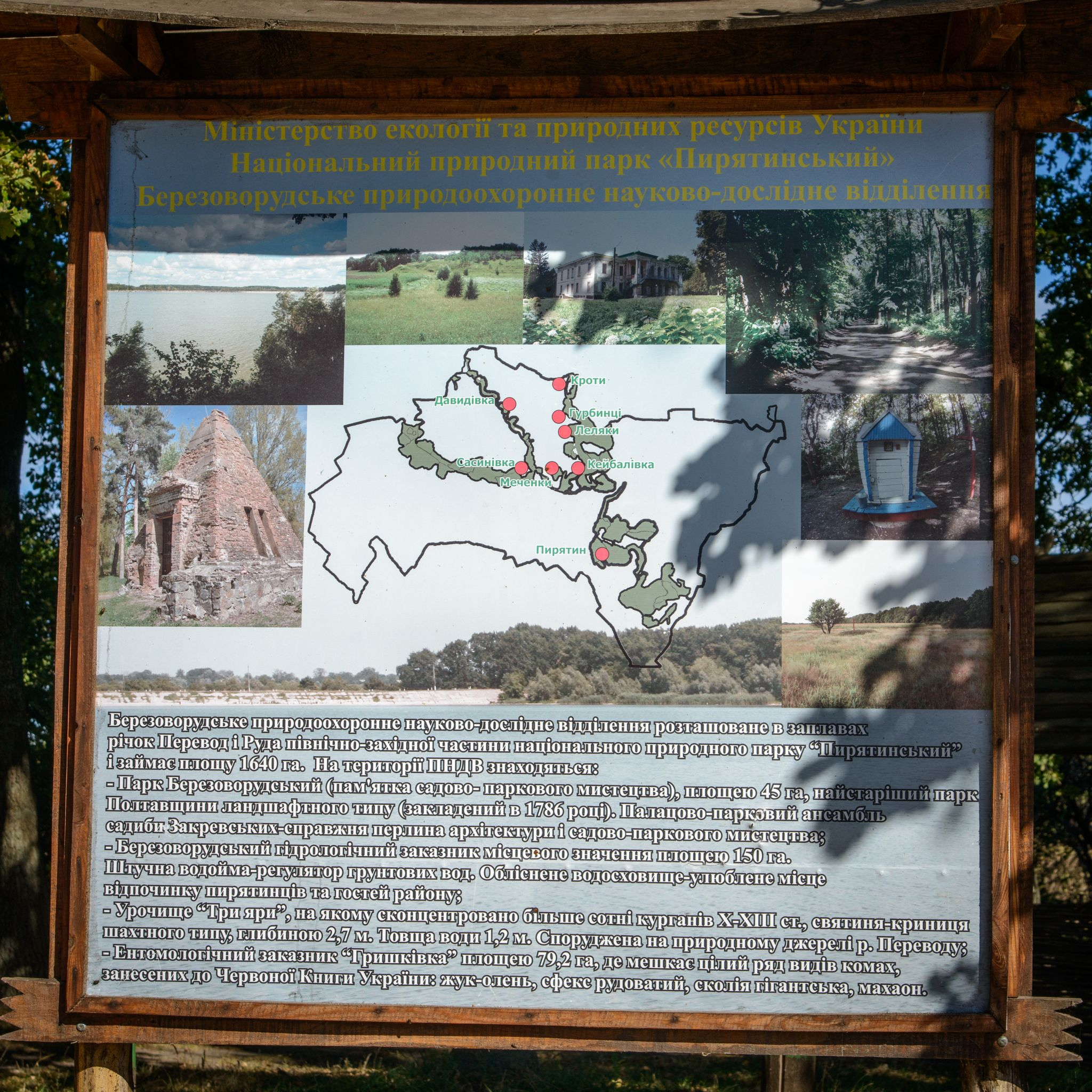
Public map on site of the Berezovorudsky Reserve, a protected portion of the Pyriatyn NNP

== Climate and ecoregion ==
The climate of Pyriatyn is Humid continental climate, warm summer (Köppen climate classification (Dfb)). This climate is characterized by large seasonal temperature differentials and a warm summer (at least four months averaging over 10 °C (50 °F), but no month averaging over 22 °C (72 °F).

The park is located in the East European forest steppe ecoregion, a transition zone between the broadleaf forests of the north and the grasslands to the south. This ecoregion is characterized by a mosaic of forests, steppe, and riverine wetlands.

== Flora and fauna ==
Being centered along a river valley, the park displayed a variety of wetlands, with river and riverbank habitat at the lowest levels, reed beds on the floodplains, mesotrophic laves and streams on the terraces, and forest-steppe where drainage permits.

== Public use ==
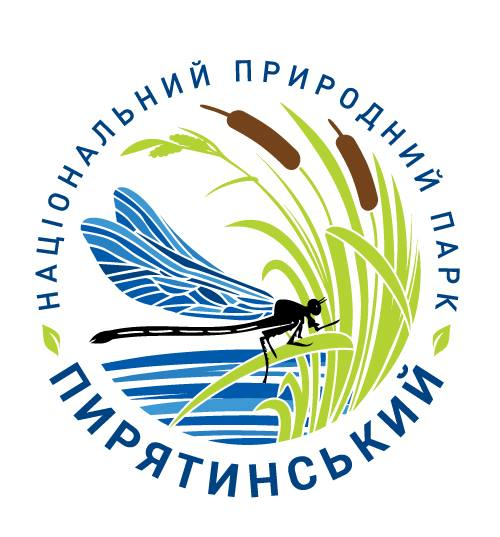
Park logo

The park is relatively new (founded in 2009), and basic tourist infrastructure has been put in place. Preliminary scientific inventories of plants and animals are underway, and the park sponsors educational programs for local schools. A number of ecological hiking trails have been developed for visitors.

== See also ==
- National Parks of Ukraine
