= Varva Raion =

Former subdivision of Chernihiv Oblast, Ukraine

Varva Raion Варвинський район
- Raion
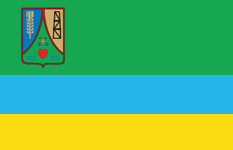
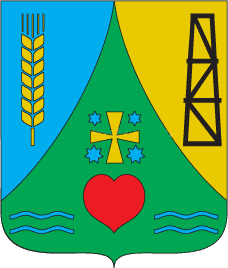
- Flag Coat of arms

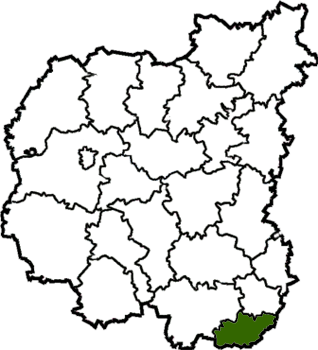
- Raion location in Chernihiv Oblast
- Coordinates: 50°27′3″N 32°44′44″E
- Country: Ukraine
- Oblast: Chernihiv Oblast
- Disestablished: 18 July 2020
- Admin. center: Varva

Area
  - Total: 590 km^{2} (230 sq mi)

Population (2020)
  - Total: 15,186
  - Density: 26/km^{2} (67/sq mi)
- Time zone: UTC+2 (EET)
  - Summer (DST): UTC+3 (EEST)
- Website: http://varadm.cg.gov.ua/

Varva Raion (Ukrainian: Варвинський район) was a raion (district) of Chernihiv Oblast, northern Ukraine. Its administrative centre was located at the urban-type settlement of Varva. The raion was abolished on 18 July 2020 as part of the administrative reform of Ukraine, which reduced the number of raions of Chernihiv Oblast to five. The area of Varva Raion was merged into Pryluky Raion. The last estimate of the raion population was 15,186 (2020 est.)

At the time of disestablishment, the raion consisted of one hromada, Varva settlement hromada with the administration in Varva.
