= Romen (river) =

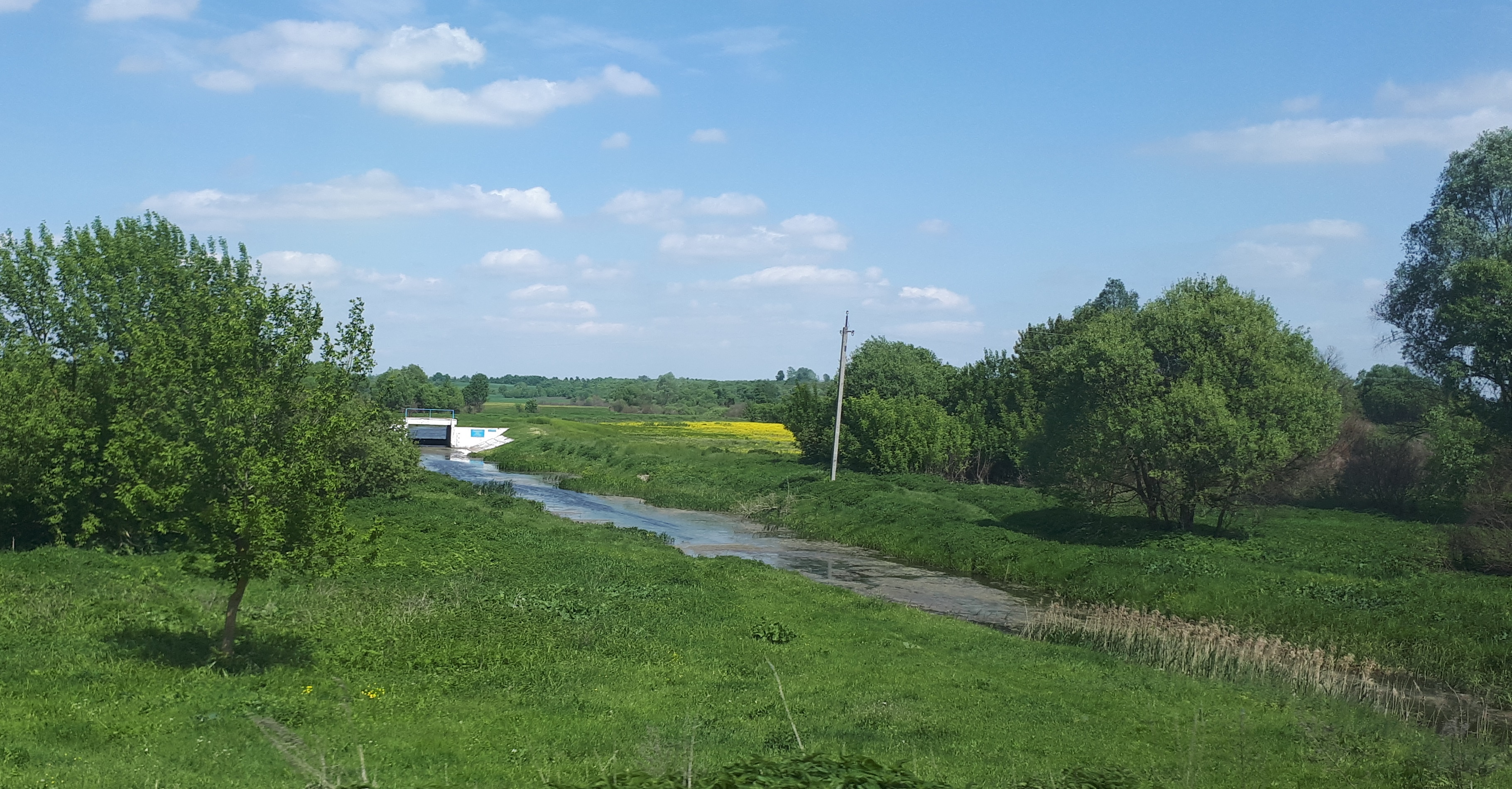
- Native name: Ромен (Ukrainian)

Location
- Country: Ukraine

Physical characteristics
- Source
  - location: Chernihiv Oblast
- Mouth: Sula
  - coordinates: 50°44′44″N 33°30′15″E
- Length: 111 km (69 mi)
- Basin size: 1,645 km^{2} (635 sq mi)
- Discharge
  - average: 3 m^{3}/s (110 cu ft/s)

Basin features
- Progression: Sula→ Dnieper→ Dnieper–Bug estuary→ Black Sea

The Romen (Ukrainian: Ромен; Russian: Ромен) is a right tributary of the Sula with a length of 111 km and a drainage basin of 1,645 km^{2}. It begins in the northern Ukrainian Oblast of Chernihiv and flows into the Sula near the Sumy Oblast city of Romny. The average discharge quantity amounts to 3 m^{3}/s at the delta.

The name is of Baltic origin, cognate with the Lithuanian romus ('quiet').
