= Pyriatyn =

City in Poltava Oblast, Ukraine

Pyriatyn Пирятин
- City
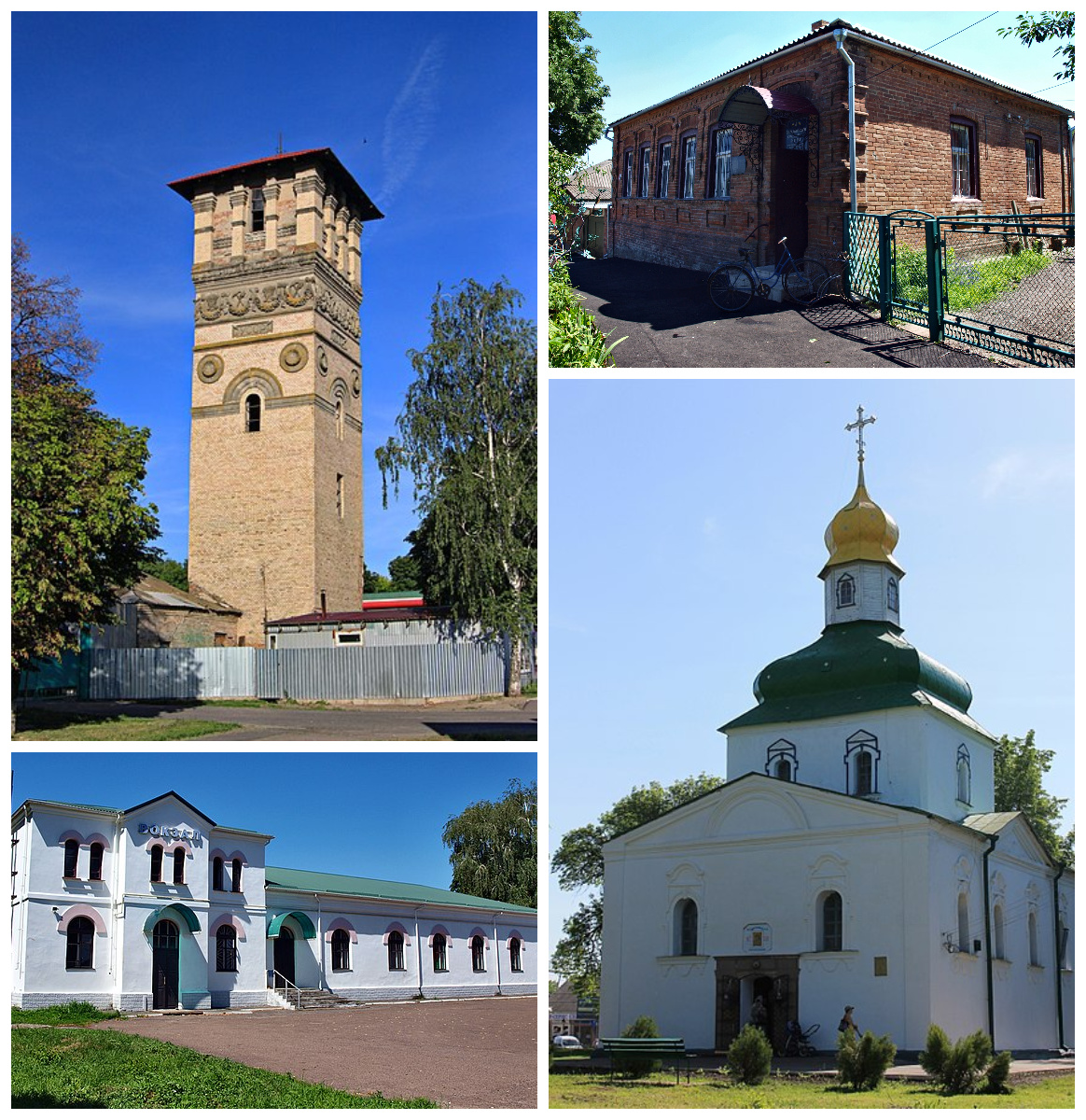
- Clockwise from top left: Water tower, Museum of History and Local Lore, Cathedral of the Nativity of the Theotokos, Railway station

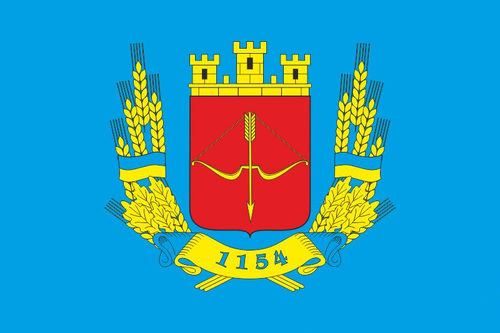
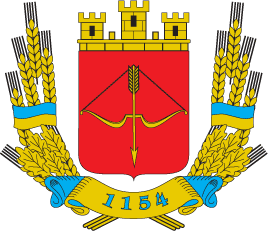
- Flag Coat of arms
- Interactive map of Pyriatyn
- Location within Poltava Oblast Location within Ukraine
- Coordinates: 50°15′N 32°32′E
- Country: Ukraine
- Oblast: Poltava Oblast
- Raion: Lubny Raion
- Hromada: Pyriatyn urban hromada

Population (2022)
  - Total: 14,988

Pyriatyn (Ukrainian: Пирятин, pronounced [pɪˈrʲɑtɪn]) is a city in Poltava Oblast, Ukraine. It served as the administrative center of Pyriatyn Raion until its abolishment in 2020. The city is located on the Dnieper Lowland, in the forest-steppe natural zone. The city of Pyriatyn is an important industrial center of Poltava region. Population: 14,988 (2022 estimate).

== History ==
Before the 20th century Pyriatyn was famous for its bublyk bread, which was popular even in Kyiv.

At the end of 1941 or beginning 1942, a ghetto guarded by policemen was established and numbered over 1,500 Jews by late March 1942. There were two major executions of Jews carried out by SD units Sonderkommando Plath, accompanied by Ukrainian auxiliary police. The first one took place on April 6, 1942, about 1530 Jews were taken to the woods, 3 km away from the town, and murdered. The second mass execution took place on May 18, 1942, when several Jewish families were killed along with 380 communists and Soviet militants, and 25 Gypsy families.

== Population ==
=== Ethnicity ===
Distribution of the population by ethnicity according to the 2001 census:

Ethnic groups in Pyriatyn
	percent
Ukrainians	93.23%
Russians	5.85%
Belarusians	0.31%
Moldovans	0.11%
Armenians	0.11%
Jews	0.07%
others	0.32%

=== Language ===
Distribution of the population by native language according to the 2001 census:

Language	Percentage
Ukrainian	93.41%
Russian	6.27%
other/undecided	0.32%

== Geography ==
The area of Pyryatyn is 118.8 sq. km. The city is located 197 km northwest of the regional center of Poltava, on the Dnieper Lowland, in the forest-steppe natural zone. 1 km upstream are the villages of Verkhoiarivka, Yivzhenky and Zamostyshche, downstream at a distance of 3 km is the village of Mala Krucha.

The city of Pyriatyn is located on the right bank of the Udai River, a right tributary of the Sula (Dnieper basin). The river in this place is winding and forms estuaries, old lakes and marshy lakes.

The climate of the Pyryatyn is temperate continental. The average temperature in January is −6.0 °C, in July it is +21.0 °C, the amount of precipitation is 480–580 mm/year, which falls mainly in the summer as rain.

The city is located at the intersection of highways leading to Kyiv, Kharkiv, Sumy, Cherkasy and Chernihiv, the distance to the international airport "Boryspil" is 135 km. The international highway M03 Kyiv-Kharkiv passes through the city.

The city of Pyriatyn is an important industrial center of Poltava Oblast. Food industry enterprises are located here. Near the city is the Pyryatynsky National Nature Park.

== Gallery ==
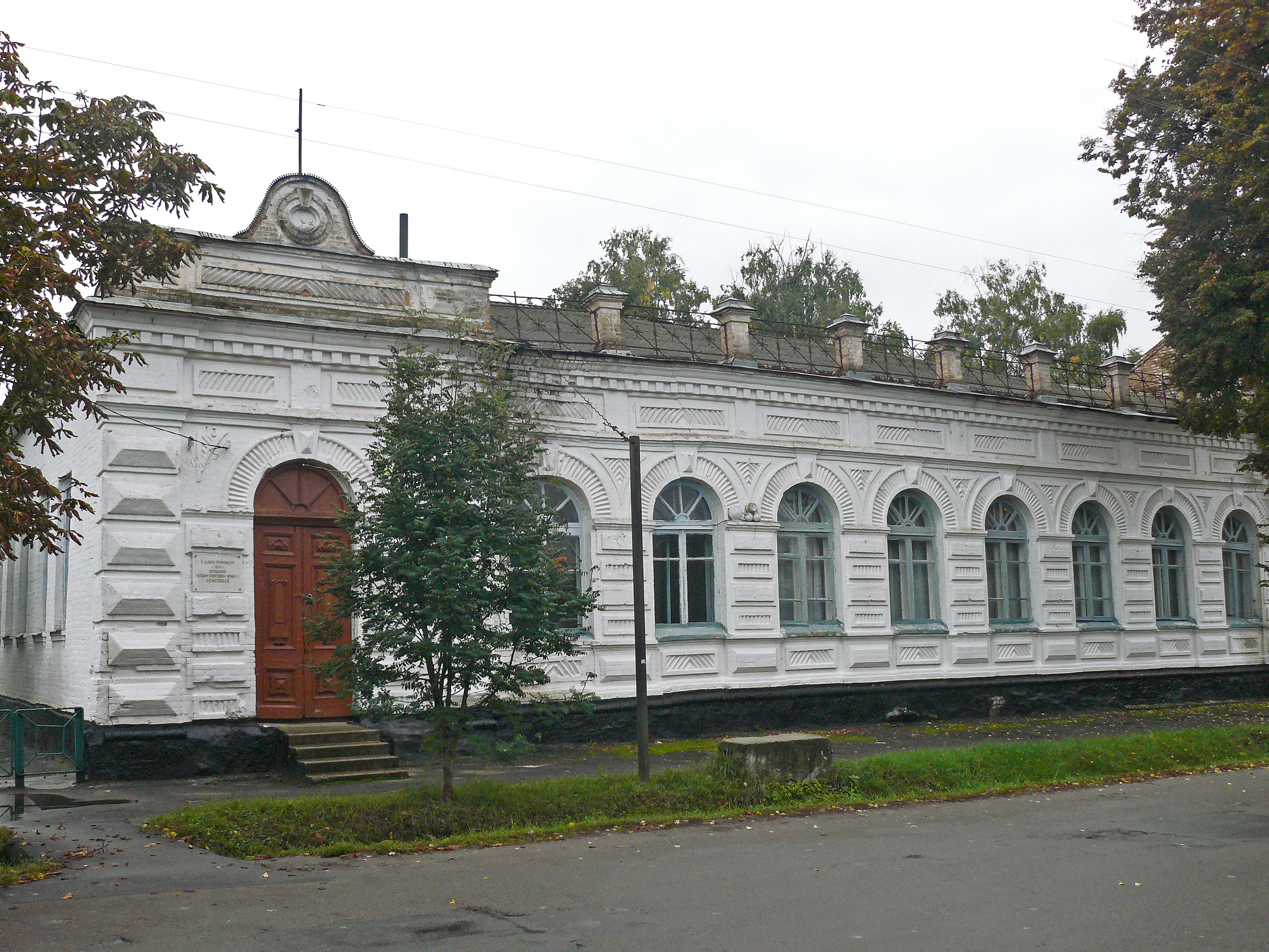
Historical building

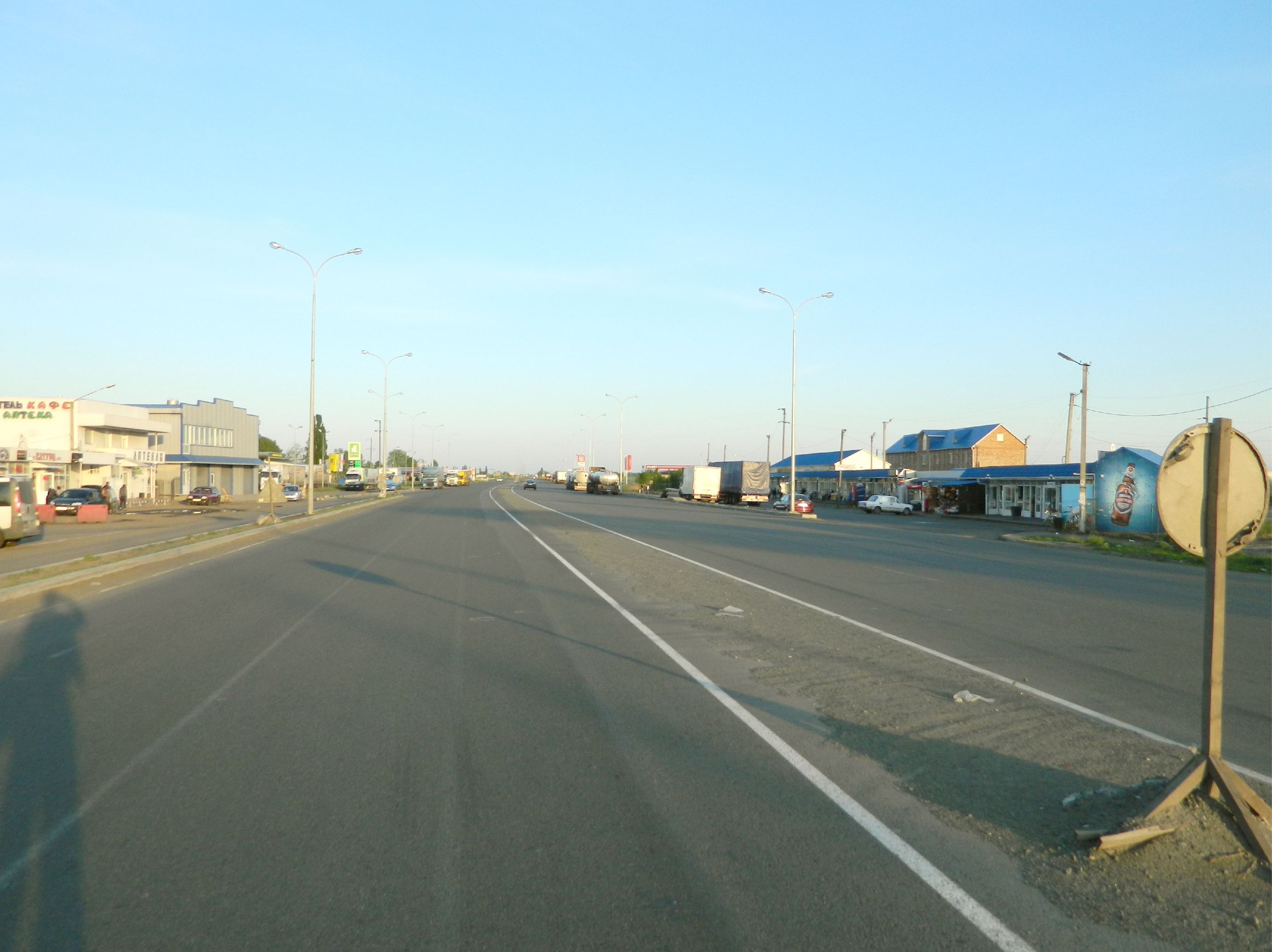
M03 Highway in Pyriatyn

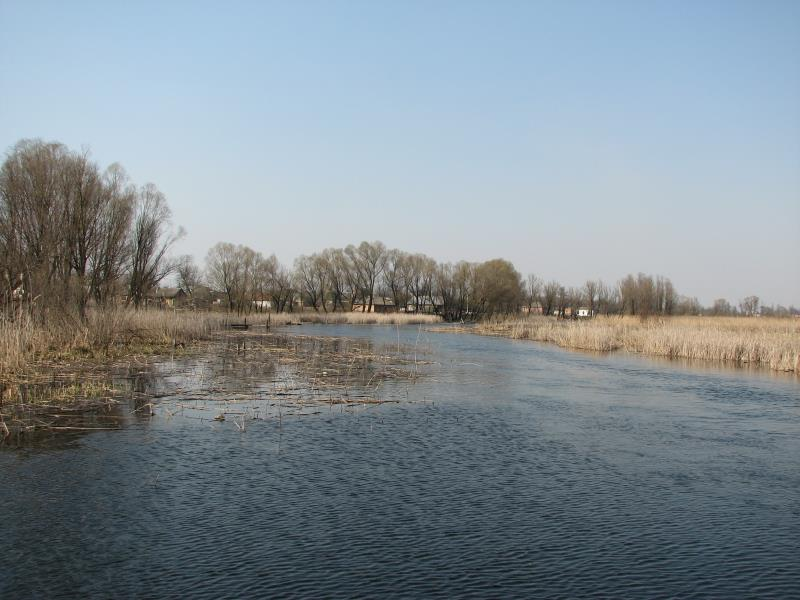
Udai River near Pyriatyn

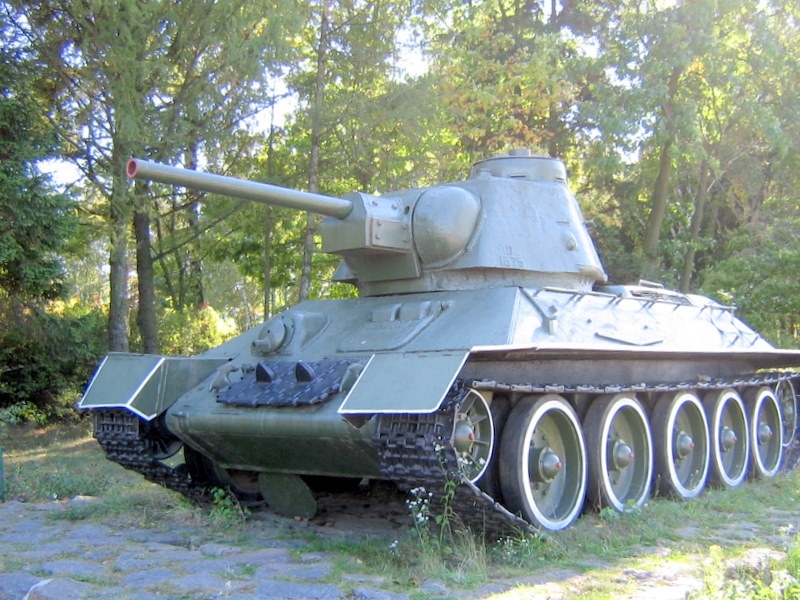
T-34 monument

== See also ==
- Piryatin Airport
