= Udai (river) =

Udai River
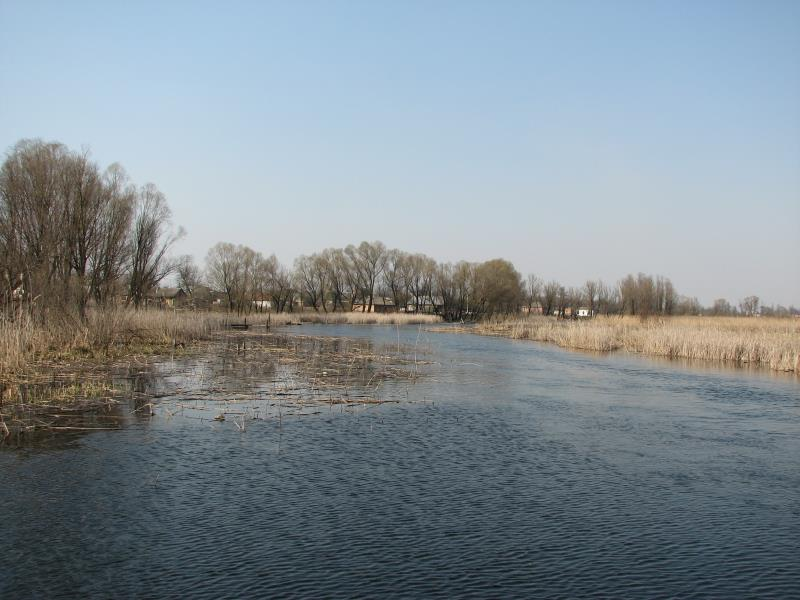
- Udai near Pyriatyn

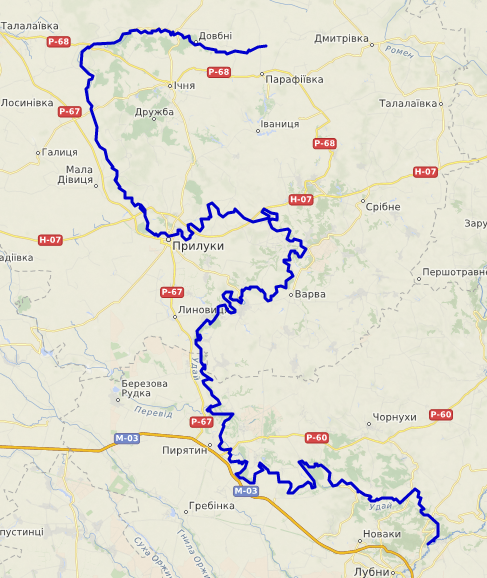

Location
- Country: Ukraine

Physical characteristics
- Source
  - location: Chernihiv Oblast
- Mouth: Sula
  - coordinates: 50°04′13″N 33°07′21″E
- Length: 327 km (203 mi)
- Basin size: 7,030 km^{2} (2,710 sq mi)

Basin features
- Progression: Sula→ Dnieper→ Dnieper–Bug estuary→ Black Sea

The Udai or Udaj (Ukrainian: Удай) is a river in Ukraine, a right tributary of the Sula, in the basin of Dnieper. It is 327 kilometres (203 mi) long, and has a drainage basin of 7,030 square kilometres (2,710 sq mi).

The Udai finds its source near the village of Rozhnivka in Pryluky Raion, Chernihiv Oblast. The river flows through the Dnieper Lowland, within the Chernihiv Oblast and the Poltava Oblast. It is predominantly fed by melting snow (nival regime). It freezes between November and early January, and it stays under the ice until March to mid April. The average discharge of the Uday at 39 km from the mouth is 9.4 m^{3}/s (330 cu ft/s).

The towns of Pryluky and Pyriatyn lie on the Udai, as well as the urban-type settlements of Dihtiari, Varva, Ladan, and the village(selo) of Pisky-Udajsjki.

== Tributaries ==
- Left: Burymnya, Ichenka, Radkivka, Smosh, Utka, Lysohir, Varva, Zhuravka, Mnoha.
- Right: Halka, Yushchenkova, Stavka, Perevid, Vilshanka.
