= Dnieper Lowland =

Geographic feature in Ukraine and East Europe

Coordinates: 49.6500°N 33.0833°E

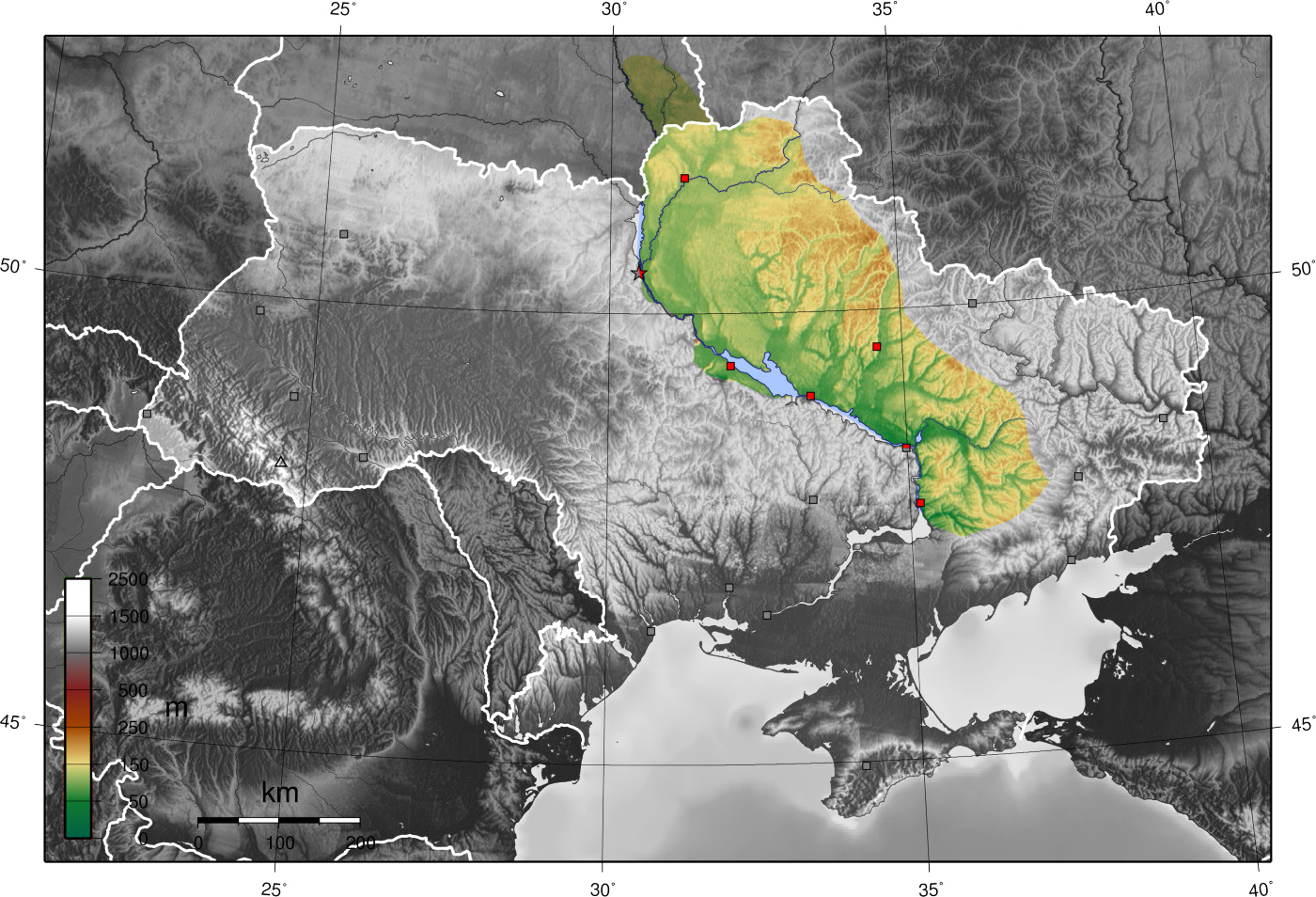

The Dnieper Lowland (also: Circumdnieper Lowland) (Ukrainian: Придніпровська низовина, romanized: Prydniprovska nyzovyna, lit. 'Cisdnipro Lowland') is a major geographic feature of the Central Ukraine region and the East European Plain. It covers the area of over 100,000 km^{2} and includes the Poltava and Chernihiv regions, as well as parts of Kyiv, Sumy, Kharkiv, Cherkasy and Dnipropetrovsk regions.

== Geography ==
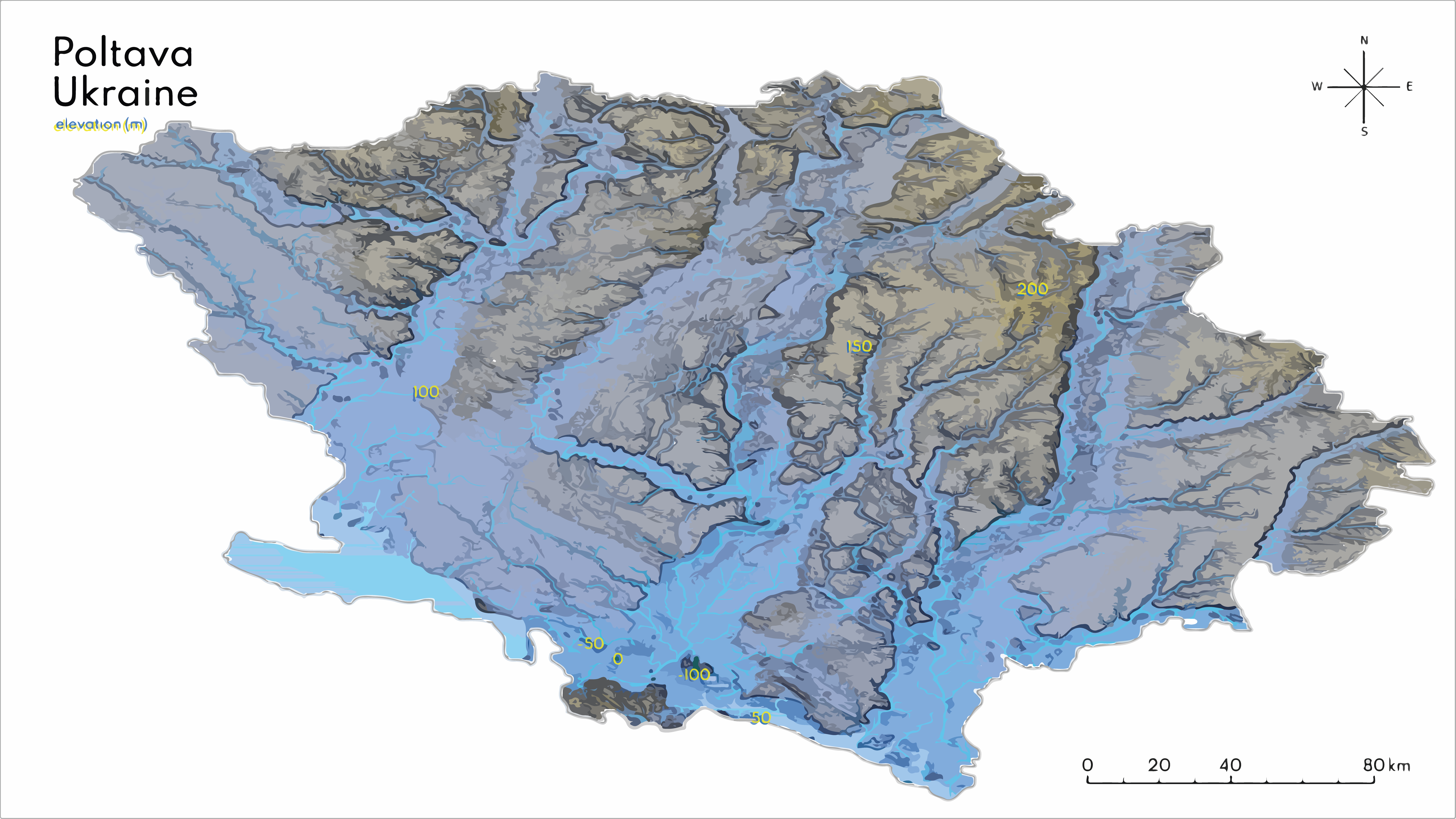
Elevation-hydrology map of Poltava region

It lies along the midstream of the Dnieper River, mostly on its left bank, spanning from the border of Belarus all the way to Dnipropetrovsk Oblast. The lowland is an extended valley of Dnieper with a system of floodplains.

To its northwest lies the swampy Polesian Lowland, to the northeast and east is the Central Russian Upland, and on the right bank of the Dnieper rises Dnieper Upland, which with Zaporizhia Ridge is connected to the Donets-Azov Plateau. The southeastern border of Dnieper Lowland follows the line of the Samara River and the Donets Ridge. In its northeastern part it joins the Donets Lowland. The northern part of the area belongs to the geographical region of Polesia and is sometimes considered to be separate from the rest of the lowland.

The surface of the Dnieper Lowland is sloped in the western and southern directions. Its altitude above sea level varies from over 200 meters in the northeast and southeast to only 40 meters at the mouth of Samara. Most of the rivers, except those in the southeastern part, flow in the southwestern direction.

== Geology ==
Geologically, the lowland is part of the Dnieper-Donets Depression which is rich in deposits of oil, gas, rock salt, and construction materials. Its Precambrian base is located at a depth of 8-10 kilometers and covered by thick sedimental layers dating from Palaeozoic to Cenozoic periods. In the southern and southeastern parts of the lowland those are represented by Cretaceous layers with reaching the depth of up to 600 meters; the rest of the territory is covered by 250-300 meter strong sand and clay layers from Paleogene period, when the area first emerged from the sea. Left-bank tributaries flowing into the Dnieper valley contributed to erosion, and the relief is covered with sediments of anthropogenic origin.

During the period of Riss glaciation the lowland was covered by a glacier, whose tip reached the mouth of Oril in the south and the divide of Psel and Sula in the east. After their retreat, the glaciers left a large number of moraines, sand and several layers loess interchanged with chernozem. A number of terraces emerged during that period. The southern part of the lowland is dissected by numerous ravines and covered with loess, meanwhile the northern part has a glacial character. At the same time, the border between the two areas is not entirely distinct, with loess islands being found in northern Polesia, and elements of forest landscape being widespread in the southern part of Dnieper valley.

== Subregions ==
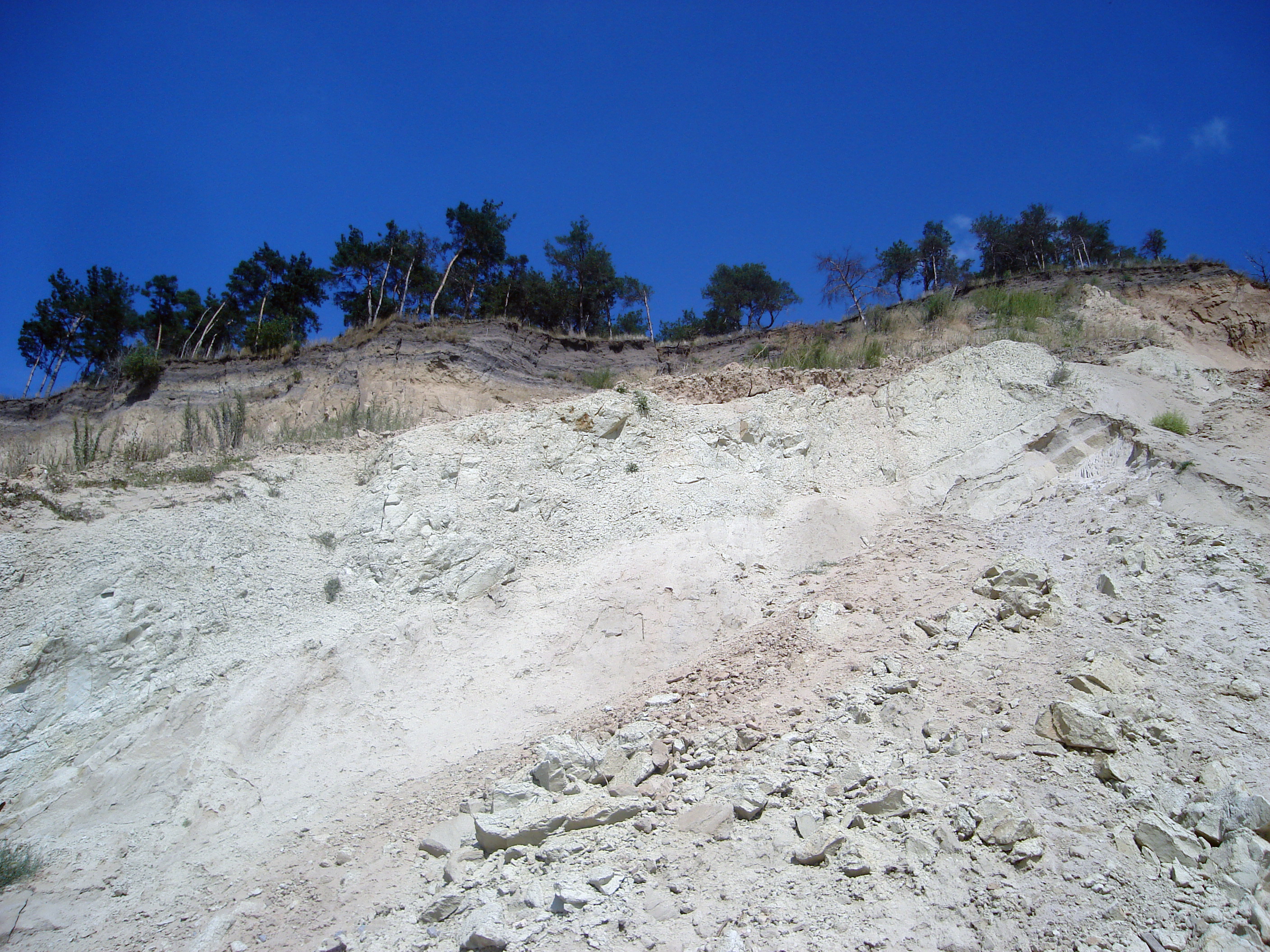
Slopes of Pyvykha

The Dnieper Lowland is divided into the bigger Dnieper Plain and smaller Poltava Plain. Dnieper Plain is located around Kyiv near confluence of Desna and Dnieper, while Poltava Plain is closer to the city of Poltava.

=== Dnieper Plain ===
Dnieper Plain represents a broad valley of the Dnieper and reaches a width of 130 km in its northern part, compared to only 20 km in the southern part. Its eastern margin reaches the cities of Hlukhiv, Pryluky, Pyriatyn and Khorol, and has its southern end at the mouth of Samara. It has little forest coverage, and its lower part forms a floodplain with large alluvial deposits. The upper part of the plain dissected in some parts by tributaries of the Dnieper, such as Trubizh, and contains several isolated hills, for example Pyvykha (169 meters).

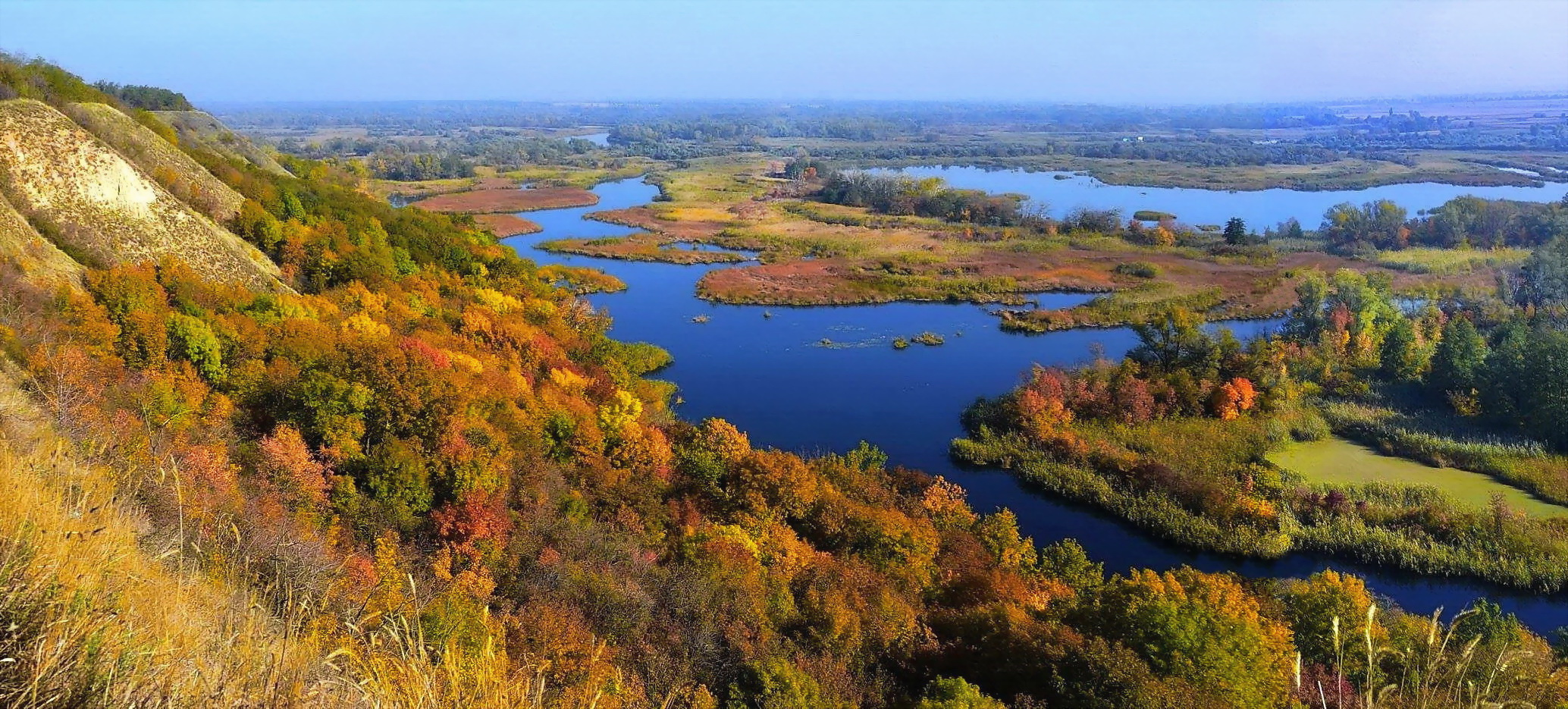
Vorskla river near Kobeliaky

=== Poltava Plain ===
Poltava Plain is separated from the Dnieper Plain along the line Ichnia - Pyriatyn - Khorol - Samar. In the northeastern part it reaches the height of 200–220 meters and joins the Middle Russian Upland. The plain is covered with thick layers of loess, with some chalk layers being present in the valley of Siverskyi Donets. The plain is dissected by several 10-12 kilometers wide river valleys reaching the depth of 70–80 meters. The slopes on the right sides of the valleys are steep and covered with forests and bushes, meanwhile the left-side slopes are gentler, covered with floodplains, sands and loess and contain ravines with numerous branches. Parts of the plain are characterized with the presence of glacial valleys connecting the river valleys. The central part contains several hills. Rows of Man-made burials with the heights of 6–8 meters are present in some locations.

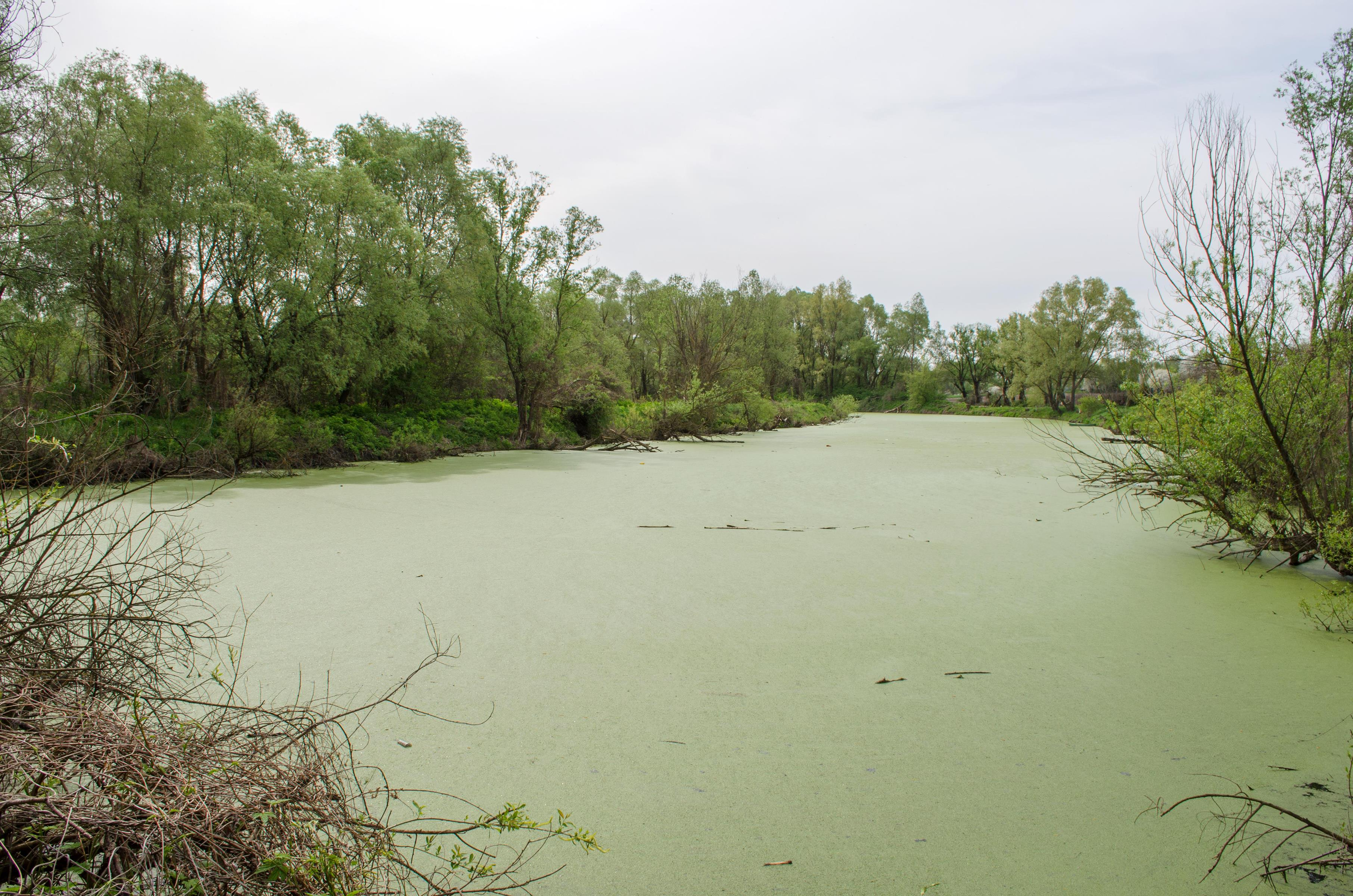
Zamhlai valley in Chernihiv region

=== Polesian areas ===
The northern part of the Dnieper Lowland is characterized by alluvial plains with terraced valleys, moraine and outwash plains, as well as dissected loess plains. The southern part of the area is a continuation of the Dnieper Plain, which reaches the line connecting the mouth of Prypiat with Desna in the area of Chernihiv and reaching the Seim. A distinct feature located in the northern part in the Zamhlai valley, which represents the old waterbed of the Dnieper and contains numerous swamps. The northeastern part is transitional to Middle Russian Upland and contains karst relief forms, especially prominent in the area of Novhorod-Siverskyi.

== Climate, earths and fauna ==
Dnieper Lowland has a moderate continental climate, with continental features becoming more prominent in the norteastern part. The southeastern part has a much drier climate than the northern areas. The forest steppe parts of the plain contain chernozem soils, meanwhile the northern part is dominated by sod and podzol. The main type of forest cover is represented by oak groves with some presence of linden. The entire territory of the steppe in the northern two thirds of the area is cultivated, meanwhile the southern part has areas covered with spear grass and Volga fescue. In the northern part of the area oak, birch, aspen, alder and pine forests, as well as meadows and swamps covered with sedges, reeds and rushes are widespread.
