= Chernozem =

Soil type; fertile black-coloured soil

- Chernozemic soil
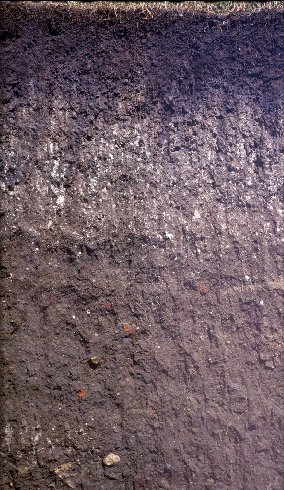
- Mollisol (USDA-NRCS)
- Used in: WRB, other
- WRB code: CH
- Profile: AhBC
- Parent material: Loess
- Climate: Humid continental

Chernozem (/ˈtʃɜːrnəzɛm/ CHUR-nə-zem), (Note: Russian: Чернозём, romanized: Chernozyom, IPA: [tɕɪrnɐˈzʲɵm]; Ukrainian: Чорнозем, romanized: Chornozem; lit. 'black ground'.) also called black soil, black earth, dark earth, regur soil or black cotton soil, is a black-colored soil containing a high percentage of humus (4% to 16%) and high percentages of phosphorus and ammonia compounds. Chernozem is very fertile and can produce high agricultural yields with its high moisture-storage capacity. However, prolonged agricultural use of chernozems still require replenishment with fertilizers because they easily can get depleted of nutrients through continuous decrease in humus content. Chernozems are a Reference Soil Group of the World Reference Base for Soil Resources (WRB). Chernozem is commonly found throughout the steppes of Russia and Ukraine, the American and Canadian Great Plains, and the South American Pampas according to most recent studies.

== Etymology ==
The name comes from the Russian terms for black (чёрный chornyy) and soil, earth or land (земля zemlya).

== Distribution ==
Distribution of chernozem soils according to the World Reference Base for Soil Resources classification: Dominant (more than 50% of soil cover) Codominant (25–50%) Associated (5–25%)

Studies of the steppe soils of the Poltava region in the Russian Empire in 1883, conducted by geologist Vasily Dokuchaev, showed that the peasants called all soils by color, so the scientist began to use such names. Chernozem was black in color due to its large amount of soil organic matter. Dokuchaev was the first to describe the chernozem of the European part of the Russian Empire, and discovered its fertility. Although distinctly classified due to its high content of iron and aluminium oxides chernozem shares many chemical and physical properties with the terra preta of the Amazon rainforest, also called Amazonian dark earths.

Chernozem covers about 230 million hectares of land. There are two "chernozem belts" in the world. One is the Eurasian Steppe that includes the Peri-Carpathian Steppe, East European Forest Steppe, Pontic-Caspian Steppe, Kazakh Steppe and Mongolian-Manchurian Steppe. The other stretches from the Canadian Prairies in Manitoba through the Great Plains of the United States as far south as Kansas.

Chernozem layer thickness may vary widely, from several centimetres up to 1.5 metres (60 inches) in Ukraine, as well as the Red River Valley region in the northern United States and Canada (location of the prehistoric Lake Agassiz).

The terrain can also be found in small quantities elsewhere (for example, in 1% of Poland and Texas). It also exists in Northeast China, near Harbin. The only true chernozem in Australia is located around Nimmitabel, some of the richest soils on the continent.

Previously, there was a black market for the soil in Ukraine. The sale of agricultural land was illegal in Ukraine from 1992 to 2020, but the soil, transported by truck, could be traded legally. According to the Kharkiv-based Green Front NGO, the black market for illegally acquired chernozem in Ukraine was projected to reach approximately US$900 million per year in 2011.

== Canadian and United States soil classification ==
Chernozemic soils are a soil type in the Canadian system of soil classification and the World Reference Base for Soil Resources (WRB).

Chernozemic soil type "equivalents", in the Canadian system, WRB, and U.S. Department of Agriculture soil taxonomy:

Canadian	WRB	United States
Chernozemic	Kastanozem, Chernozem, Phaeozem	Mollisol
Brown Chernozem	Kastanozem (Aridic)	Aridic Mollisol subgroups (Xerolls and Ustolls)
Dark Brown Chernozem	Haplic Kastanozem	Typic Mollisol subgroups
Black Chernozem	Chernozem	Udic Mollisol subgroups
Dark Grey Chernozem	Greyzemic Phaeozem	Boralfic Mollisol subgroups, Albolls
Source: Canadian system of soil classification (third edition)

== Theories of chernozem origin ==
- 1763: Mikhail Lomonosov (plant and animal decomposition)
- 1840: Sir Roderick Murchison (weathered from Jurassic marine shales)
- 1850: Karl Eichwald (lake sediments)
- 1851: Alexander Petzgold (marine sediments)
- 1866: Franz Josef Ruprecht (decomposed steppe grasses)
- 1879: First chernozem papers translated from Russian
- 1883: Vasily Dokuchaev published his book Russian Chernozem with a complete study of this soil in European Russia.
- 1929: Otto Schlüter (man-made)
- 1999: Michael W. I. Schmidt (neolithic biomass burning)

As seen in the list above, the 19th and 20th-century discussions on the pedogenesis of chernozem originally stemmed from climatic conditions from the early Holocene to roughly 5500 BC. However, no single paleoclimate reconstruction could accurately explain geochemical variations found in chernozems throughout central Europe. Evidence of anthropic origins of stable pyrogenic carbon in chernozem led to improved formation theories. Vegetation burning could explain chernozem's high magnetic susceptibility, the highest of the major soil types. Soil magnetism increases when soil minerals goethite and ferrihydrite convert to maghemite on exposure to heat. Temperatures sufficient to elevate maghemite on a landscape scale indicate the influence of fire. Given the rarity of such natural phenomena in the modern day, magnetic susceptibility in chernozem likely relates to control of fire by early humans.

Humification can darken soils (melanization) even in the absence of a pyrogenic carbon component. However, charcoal, also called black carbon when in the form of fine carbon particles, has been shown to be a prominent component of grassland soils in the Russian Steppe, the U.S. Great Plains, the Argentinian Pampa, the Manchurian Plains in China, and the Chernozem region in central Germany. Given the symphony of pedogenic processes that contribute to the formation of dark earths, chernozem summarizes different types of black soils with the same appearance but different formation histories.

== See also ==
- Loam
- Dark earth
- Terra preta
- Vertisol
- Mollisol
- Soil organic matter
