= Sula (Dnieper) =

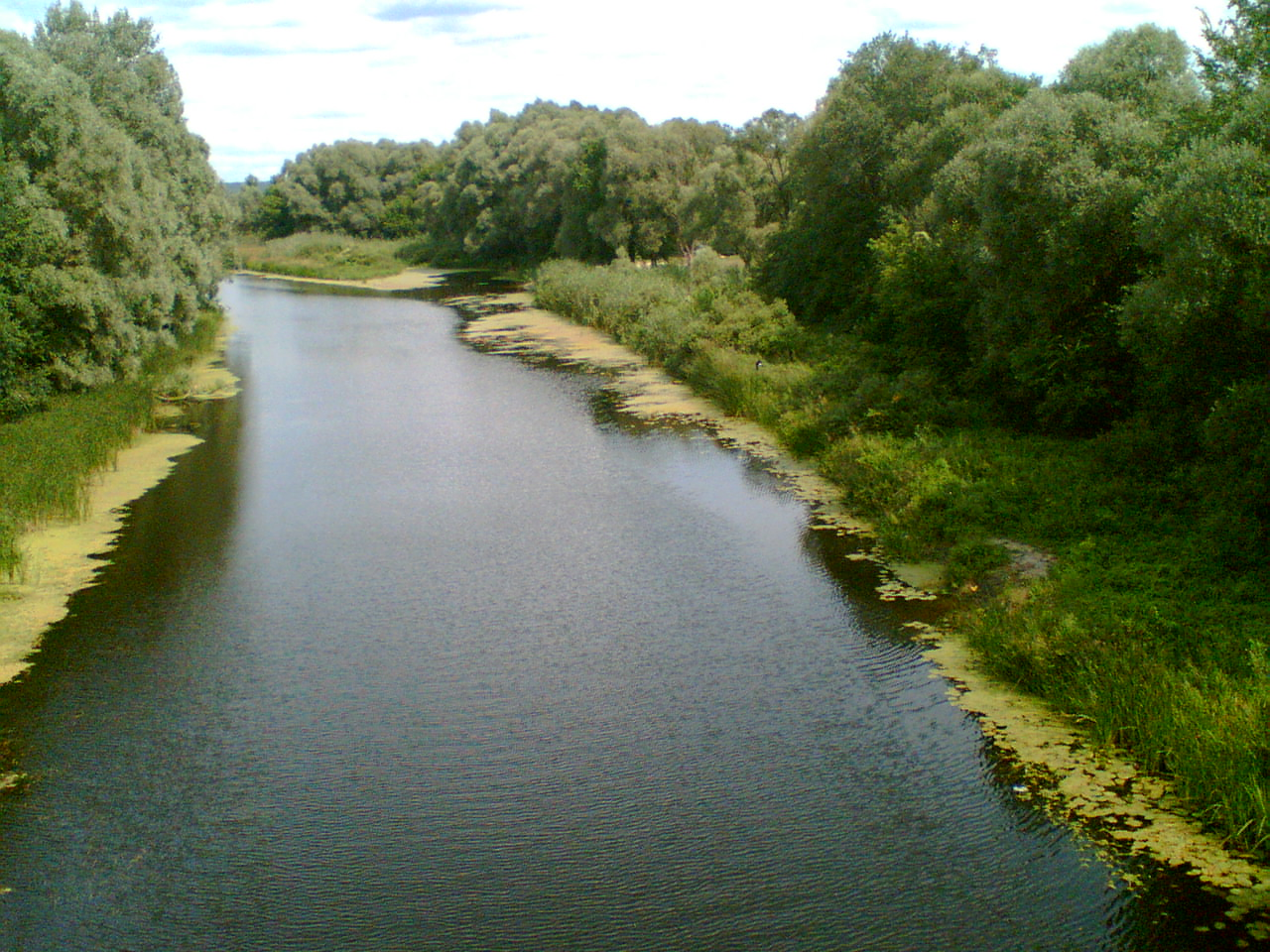
- Native name: Сула

Location
- Country: Ukraine

Physical characteristics
- Source
  - location: Sumy Oblast
- Mouth: Dnieper
  - coordinates: 49.5553°N 32.7544°E
- Length: 363 km (226 mi)
- Basin size: 19,600 km^{2} (7,600 sq mi)
- Discharge
  - average: 29 m^{3}

Basin features
- Progression: Dnieper→ Dnieper–Bug estuary→ Black Sea
- Tributaries
  - right: Romen, Uday

The Sula (Ukrainian: Сула) is a left tributary of the Dnieper with a total length of 363 kilometres (226 mi) and a drainage basin of 19,600 square kilometres (7,600 sq mi).

The river flows into the Dnieper through the Kremenchuk Reservoir, with which it forms a large delta with numerous islands, on which rare kinds of birds live. An important tributary is the Uday, smaller ones being Orzhytsya, Sliporid, Romen and Tern.

Large cities located on the river are Romny, Lokhvytsia and Lubny.

== Etymology ==
The river's name evokes slow or muddy waters considering the words it is related to: Lithuanian/Latvian sulà "birch sap", Old Prussian sulo "curdled milk", Norwegian dialectal saula "dirt", Sanskrit súrā "spiritous liquor", and Avestan hurā "intoxicating drink, kumis". Another etymology of the hydronym Sula is the Turkic suly, 'filled with water, wet'.
