= Druzhba, Chernihiv Oblast =

Rural locality in Chernihiv Oblast, Ukraine

Druzhba Дружба
- Rural settlement
- Location within Chernihiv Oblast Location within Ukraine
- Coordinates: 50°48′10″N 32°21′19″E
- Country: Ukraine
- Oblast: Chernihiv Oblast
- Raion: Pryluky Raion

Population (2022)
  - Total: 907
- Time zone: UTC+2 (EET)
  - Summer (DST): UTC+3 (EEST)

Druzhba (Ukrainian: Дружба; Russian: Дружба) is a rural settlement in Pryluky Raion, Chernihiv Oblast, northern Ukraine. It belongs to Ichnia urban hromada, one of the hromadas of Ukraine. Population: 907 (2022 estimate).

== History ==
In 2025 the population of the settlement was 793 people.

Until 18 July 2020, Druzhba belonged to Ichnia Raion. The raion was abolished in July 2020 as part of the administrative reform of Ukraine, which reduced the number of raions of Chernihiv Oblast to five. The area of Ichnia Raion was merged into Pryluky Raion.

Until 26 January 2024, Druzhba was designated urban-type settlement. On this day, a new law entered into force which abolished this status, and Druzhba became a rural settlement.

=== Transportation ===
The closest railway station, Avgustovskyi, is several kilometers away from the settlement, on the railway connecting Bakhmach and Pryluky. There is infrequent passenger traffic.

Roads connects Druzhba with Ichnia and Mala Divytsia. In Mala Dyvitsia, there is access to Highway H08 connecting Kyiv and Sumy.
