= Oleksa Storozhenko =

Ukrainian writer, anthropologist, and playwright

- Олекса Стороженко
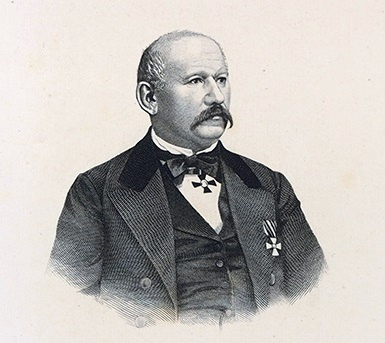
- Oleksa Storozhenko
- Born: Олексій Петрович Стороженко; 24 November 1806; Lysohory, Chernigov Governorate, Russian Empire (now Ukraine)
- Died: 6 November 1874 (aged 67); Brest-Litovsk, Grodno Governorate, Russian Empire (now Belarus)
- Writing career
- Language: Ukrainian, Russian
- Movement: Romanticism

Oleksiy Petrovych Storozhenko (Ukrainian: Олексій Петрович Стороженко; 24 November 1806, Lysohory, Chernigov Governorate, Russian Empire – 6 November 1874, Berestia, Russian Empire), commonly known as Oleksa Storozhenko (Ukrainian: Олекса Стороженко), was a Ukrainian writer, poet, anthropologist, playwright and government official in the Russian Empire.

== Biography ==
Oleksa Storozhenko was born on 24 November 1806 in Lysohory (now part of Chernihiv Oblast). His father was a descendant of Cossack starshyna, meanwhile his mother stemmed from the Kartvelian princely family of Muskhelishvili. Storozhenko's maternal great-grandfather had moved to the Russian Empire in 1724 and, after undergoing service in the Georgian hussar regiment, settled in the town of Velyki Budyshcha (now in Poltava Oblast).

According to Storozhenko's own memoirs, as a young man he had an interest for art, and even supposedly received the title of academician after creating a project of a monument to Nestor the Chronicler. After graduating from the Sloboda Ukraine Governorate gymnasium, Storozhenko chose a career in the Russian Imperial Army. In that status, he reached the rank of senior staff officer of a cavalry corps, taking part in the Russo-Turkish War of 1829 and participating in the suppression of the Polish Uprising of 1831 and Hungarian Revolution of 1848.

In 1850 Storozhenko was appointed to serve as a special commissioner under Dmitry Bibikov, governor-general of Kiev, and later took a similar position in the Interior Ministry. During that time he took part in several criminal investigations, despite not being a professional criminologist. In 1863 he received the rank of Active State Councillor. In 1864 Storozhenko was transferred to the Northwestern Krai (modern Belarus), where he served as an official under the local governor general Mikhail Muravyov. Later in his life, Storozhenko was elected Marshal of Nobility of Brest uezd, and in 1868-1874 headed the congress of justices of peace.

== Literary career ==
As a young man, Storozhenko was greatly influenced by the writings of Hryhorii Kvitka-Osnovyanenko, Orest Somov, Yevhen Hrebinka and Nikolai Gogol. In his 1859 essay published in Otechestvennye Zapiski, he even claimed to have personally met Gogol during the 1820s, although in reality this meeting was chronologically unlikely. During his army service, Storozhenko frequently travelled around the Ukrainian province, and used his trips to record folk stories, legends and historical memoirs.

Storozhenko began writing in the 1850s. Many of his works are based on Ukrainian folklore and stories from lives of Ukrainian peasants. He initially wrote in Russian, before debuting as a Ukrainian-language writer in 1861. His works were published in Osnova journal published in Saint Petersburg. However, measures undertaken by the Imperial Russia's agencies enforcing the Valuev Circular (a legal decree reflecting persecution against the Ukrainian language) became one of the reasons why Oleksa Storozhenko had to continue his writings in Russian.

Storozhenko's style of writing is marked by earthy Ukrainian language and picturesque representation of the folk proverbs, anecdotes, sayings and songs. The leading topics of his works are: Ukrainians’ everyday life, customs, folklore and demonological believes, historical events, particularly kozaks and Zaporozhian Sich. Novella Zakokhanyi Chort (Devil in Love) and novel Marko Prokliatyi (Damned Marko) are fine examples of Gothic-Romantic literature. Literary critics find parallel between Storozhenko's Devil in Love and Le Diable Amoureux (The Devil in Love, 1772) by the French gothic author, Jacques Cazotte.

=== Notable publications ===
- 1858 – Rasskazy iz Krestyanskogo Byta Malorossiian (Stories from the Peasant Life of Little Russians).
- 1857 – Bratiya Bliznetsy (Twin Brothers; historical novel).
- 1861 – Zakokhanyi Chort (Devil in Love)
- 1863 – Ukrainski Opovidannia (Ukrainian Stories; a two-volume collection of short stories, which author wrote in 1850, was published in Saint-Petersburg).
- 1870 – Marko Prokliatyi (Damned Marko; gothic novel, unfinished) Оnly two first chapters of the novel were published during Storozhenko's life (Pravda (The Truth) Lviv, 1870).

Storozhenko's other titles include: Vchy linyvoho ne molotom a holodom (Teach the Lazy Man not by Hammer but by Hunger), Mezhyhorodskyi did (The Old Man from Mezhyhorod), Vusy (The Moustache), Holka (The Needle) and Matusyne Blahoslovennia (Mother's Blessing).

== Evaluation and legacy ==
Grave of Oleksa Storozhenko in Brest, Belarus

Storozhenko's stories were written in a typically Romantic manner, and as a result were seen as anachronistic at the time of their publication during the late 1850s and 1860s; Dmytro Chyzhevskyi characterized him as an "overdue Romantic". A 1863 critical review in the magazine Sovremennik accused the author of excess idealization of Ukrainian life, lack of authenticity and failure to mention actual social issues in his texts. Storozhenko criticized Ukrainian cultural circles fo their failure to protect his image from that criticism, and this eventually played a role in his transition to Russian-language writing.

In the opinion of Ukrainian literary critic Ahatanhel Krymskyi, the fact that Storozhenko could be coerced to abandon his participation in Ukrainian literary life shows the limits of his Ukrainophilia. This is also confirmed by his praise of interior minister Pyotr Valuev, who initiated a ban on Ukrainian publishing. In Storozhenko's view, loyalty to the empire was no contradiction to his fascination with Ukrainian folklore and nature.

Despite his antiquated style and lack of artistic taste, Storozhenko's writings have produced a major influence on Ukrainian literature. His legacy is seen in works of Ukrainian "chimeric prose" genre, which developed stating from the late 1950s. Elements of Storozhenko's style also influenced the work of Ukrainian translators, such as Mykola Lukash.
