= Kachanivka, Chernihiv Oblast =

Rural settlement in Chernihiv Oblast, Ukraine

Kachanivka Качанівка
- Rural settlement
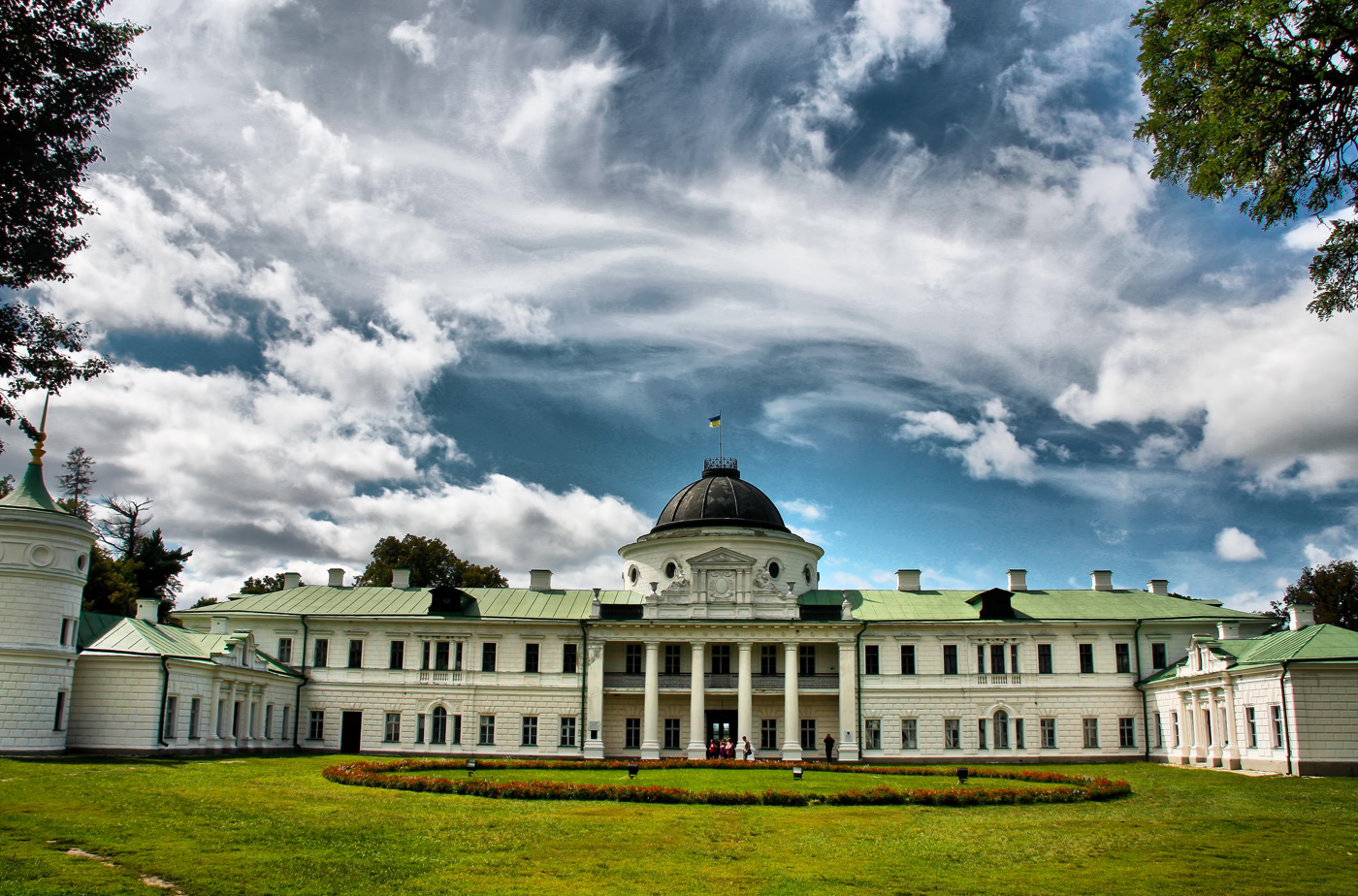
- Kachanivka estate

- Location of Kachanivka Kachanivka (Ukraine)
- Coordinates: 50°50′22″N 32°39′53″E
- Country: Ukraine
- Oblast: Chernihiv Oblast
- Raion: Pryluky Raion
- Hromada: Parafiivka settlement hromada
- Elevation: 160 m (520 ft)

Population (2001)
  - Total: 48
- Postal code: 16735
- Area code: +380 4633
- Climate: Cfa

Kachanivka (Ukrainian: Качанівка) is a rural settlement in Pryluky Raion, Chernihiv Oblast, Ukraine. It belongs to Parafiivka settlement hromada, one of the hromadas of Ukraine.

Until 18 July 2020, Kachanivka was located in Ichnia Raion. The raion was abolished on 18 July 2020 as part of the administrative reform of Ukraine, which reduced the number of raions of Chernihiv Oblast to five.

== Geography ==
The Kachanivka is located in the north of Pryluky raion, 150 km from Chernihiv, 20 km from Ichnia, and 55 km from Pryluky. The height above sea level is 164 m. The territory of the settlement located within the Dnieper Lowland. The relief of the Kachanivka surface is a lowland plain, in places dissected by river valleys. There are many ponds in Parafiivka.

The climate of Kachanivka is moderately continental, with warm summers and relatively mild winters. The average temperature in January is about -7 °C, and in July - +19 °C. The average annual precipitation ranges from 550 to 660 mm, with the highest amount of precipitation in the summer period.

The soil cover of the settlement is dominated by chernozem and podzolized soils. The Kachanivka is located the forest steppe, on the Polesia.

The National Historical and Cultural Reserve "Kachanivka" is located on the territory of the village, which consists of a palace ensemble and a park with 12 ponds, founded in the 1770s.

== Economy ==
=== Transportation ===
The nearest railway stop is located in Parafiivka ( Bakhmach-Pryluky line). The road to Parafiivka and Ivanitsa passes through Kachanivka.
