= Olshana =

Olshana Ольшана
- Village
- Location of Rannya Zorya within Ukraine Olshana (Ukraine)
- Coordinates: 50°44′7″N 32°26′54″E
- Country: Ukraine
- Oblast: Chernihiv Oblast
- Raion: Pryluky Raion
- Founded: 1600

Area
  - Total: 4,169 km^{2} (1,610 sq mi)
- Elevation: 138 m (453 ft)

Population (2001 census)
  - Total: 511
  - Density: 0.123/km^{2} (0.317/sq mi)
- Time zone: UTC+2 (EET)
  - Summer (DST): UTC+3 (EEST)
- Postal code: 16763
- Area code: +380 4633

Olshana (Ukrainian: Ольшана) is a village in Ukraine, in Pryluky Raion of Chernihiv Oblast. It belongs to Ichnia urban hromada, one of the hromadas of Ukraine. From 1962 to 2007, the village was known as Vilshana. The population is 511 people. The Olshana's village council is governed by 2 farms: Tarasivka and Zhovtneve (since 2016, the village of Nova Olshana).

Until 18 July 2020, Olshana belonged to Ichnia Raion. The raion was abolished in July 2020 as part of the administrative reform of Ukraine, which reduced the number of raions of Chernihiv Oblast to five. The area of Ichnia Raion was merged into Pryluky Raion.

== Geography ==
Olshana is located in the northwest of Chernihiv Oblast, in the center of Pryluky Raion. The village is within the Dnieper Lowland. The relief of the Olshana surface is a lowland plain. All rivers belong to the Dnieper basin. The largest river is the Udai, a tributary of the Sula.

The climate of Olshana is moderately continental, with warm summers and relatively mild winters. The average temperature in January is about -7 °C, and in July - +19 °C. The average annual precipitation ranges from 550 to 660 mm, with the highest amount of precipitation in the summer period.

The soil cover of the Olshana is dominated by chernozem and podzolized soils. The urban hromada is located in the natural zone of the forest steppe, in Polissya. The main species in the forests are pine, oak, alder, ash, and birch.

== Economy ==
The leading sectors of the Olshana economy are agriculture, food industry, and forestry. Agriculture specializes in growing grain and industrial crops, cattle breeding, pig breeding and poultry farming.

=== Transportation ===
The regional highway from Ichnia to Pryluky passes through Olshany. The nearest railway station is located in Pryluky, and the stop for suburban trains connecting Bakhmach - Hrebinka is east of the village, in Kolomiytseve.
