= Zaudaika =

Zaudaika Заудайка
- Village
- Location within Ukraine Location within Chernihiv Oblast
- Coordinates: 50°50′15″N 32°11′34″E
- Country: Ukraine
- Oblast: Chernihiv Oblast
- Raion: Pryluky Raion
- Founded: 1580

Area
  - Total: 30.4 km^{2} (11.7 sq mi)
- Elevation: 120 m (390 ft)

Population (2021 estimate)
  - Total: 430
  - Density: 14/km^{2} (37/sq mi)
- Time zone: UTC+2 (EET)
  - Summer (DST): UTC+3 (EEST)
- Postal code: 16763
- Area code: +380 4633

Zaudaika (Ukrainian: Заудайка) is a village in Ukraine, in Pryluky Raion of Chernihiv Oblast. It belongs to Ichnia urban hromada, one of the hromadas of Ukraine.

== Name ==
The name of the village "Zaudaika" comes from the concept "beyond the Udai River", which crosses the village. Also, not far from the village was the left tributary of the Udai River with the same name "Zaudaika", which led to the territory of the Ichnian hundred, Pryluky Regiment, Cossack Hetmanate.

== Geography ==
The village of Zaudaika is located on the left bank of the Udai River, the village of Andriivka is located upstream at a distance of 4.5 km, the village of Korshaky is located downstream at a distance of 1 km, and the village of Monastyryshche is located on the opposite bank. The river in this place is heavily swamped (Udai swamp), and many irrigation canals have been built around it.

The Bobrovytsia-Ichnia T 2527 road of territorial importance passes through the village.

== Toponyms ==
The village of Zaudaika has such historical microtoponyms as:

Corners: Moldavivka, Liman, Borshchivka, Smilikivka, Maidanivka, Mazhnivka, Shlyah, Vigon, Zhadkivka, Vokzal, Zhabokryakivka, Galyonka, Solovyanivka, Gora;

Tracts: Levada, Pysarka, Zanivshchyna, Ostacha, Yaskovets, Mistechko;

Hills: Pashevy;

Bridges: First, Second (Mistechko), Third (Monastyrischenskyi);

Forests: Malyukivshchyna, Melgovshchyna, Kudlayeve, Khoptivshchyna Persha, Khoptivshchyna Second, Gogolivshchyna (Chobit), Kanzyubina Sosna, Levada, Maksymovycha.

== Demography ==
Historical population
| Year | Pop. | ±% |
|---|---|---|
| 1737 | 690 | — |
| 1782 | 581 | −15.8% |
| 1808 | 684 | +17.7% |
| 1824 | 543 | −20.6% |
| 1828 | 581 | +7.0% |
| 1834 | 591 | +1.7% |
| 1866 | 685 | +15.9% |
| 1885 | 759 | +10.8% |
| 1897 | 1,361 | +79.3% |
| 1924 | 1,978 | +45.3% |
| 1972 | 934 | −52.8% |
| 1988 | 1,007 | +7.8% |
| 1996 | 815 | −19.1% |
| 2001 | 727 | −10.8% |
| 2012 | 508 | −30.1% |
| 2017 | 452 | −11.0% |
| 2018 | 449 | −0.7% |
| 2021 | 430 | −4.2% |

The inhabitants of the village are mostly Ukrainians.

The demographic base of the village was undermined by the genocide of the Ukrainian people, which was also carried out in this village by the USSR government in 1932-1933.

The next blow was the forcible mobilization of young people into Stalin's troops, the majority of whom were killed on the fronts of the Second World War, as well as illegally held in the army for hard labor (until the 1950s).

Since the 1990s, the reduction of the rural population has reached alarming proportions, most of the young people emigrated to the cities, which caused a deep demographic crisis.

During the 2001 Ukrainian census, the population of the village was 727 people, 98.62% were Ukrainians, 1.38% were Russians.

== History ==
The ancient great caravan road from Kyiv to Bulgaria passed through the village, which was used for brisk trade with Khazaria.

The village has been known since 1580, according to other data — since 1632. According to the charter of the Polish king Sigismund III from 1590, Zaudaika, together with a number of other settlements, was transferred to the ownership of Prince Jeremi Wiśniowiecki.

Zaudaika was founded on the left bank of the Udai as an outpost of the village of Monastyryshche in connection with the expansion of the settlement.

Since 1648, after the start of Bohdan Khmelnytskyi's war for independence of Ukraine, Zaudaika was part of the newly created Monastyryshche Hundred of the Pryluky Regiment, and the inhabitants of the village were registered as Cossacks.

During the Second World War, 357 residents were mobilized to the ranks of the Red Army and partisan units against the German troops, 217 of them died. For the courage and bravery shown in the fight against the enemy, 67 residents were awarded orders and medals of the USSR. Also, during the war, the Nazis forcibly took 18 local residents to Germany and shot two communists.

During the Soviet intervention in Afghanistan in 1979-1989, 18 residents of Zaudaika served in the military, one of them died - Vasyl Borshch. After the withdrawal of Soviet troops from Afghanistan, Vasyl Mykytchenko, one of the Zaudaika participants in those events, wrote the book "From Zaudaika to Kabul".

== Sources ==
- Село Заудайка Ічнянського району Чернігівської області
- Описание старой Малороссии. Материалы для истории заселения, землевладения и управления : в 3 т. / Ал. Лазаревский. - Киев : Тип. К. Н. Милевского, 1888 - 1893. Т. 3 : Полк Прилуцкий. – 1893. – XIV, 426, XV (ст. 212-215)
- Прилуччина: Енциклопедичний довідник / За ред. Г. Ф. Гайдая. - Ніжин: TOB "Видавництво "Аспект-Поліграф", 2007. - 560 с. ISBN 978-966-340-221-5
- Чернігівщина : енциклопедичний довідник / за ред. А.В. Кудрицького. : Українська радянська енциклопедія ім. М.П. Бажана, 1990.
