= Parafiivka =

Rural locality in Chernihiv Oblast, Ukraine

Parafiivka Парафіївка
- Rural settlement
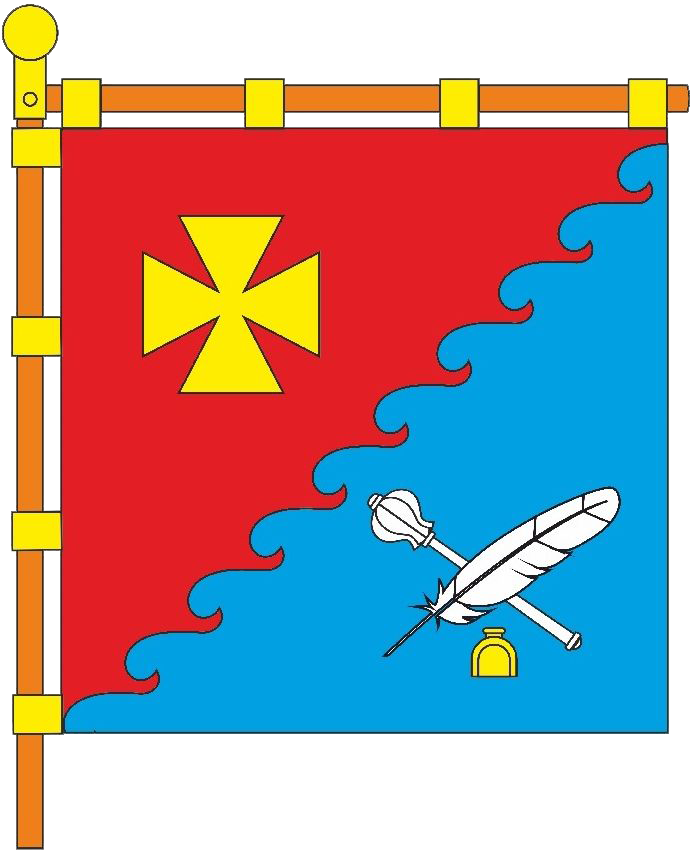
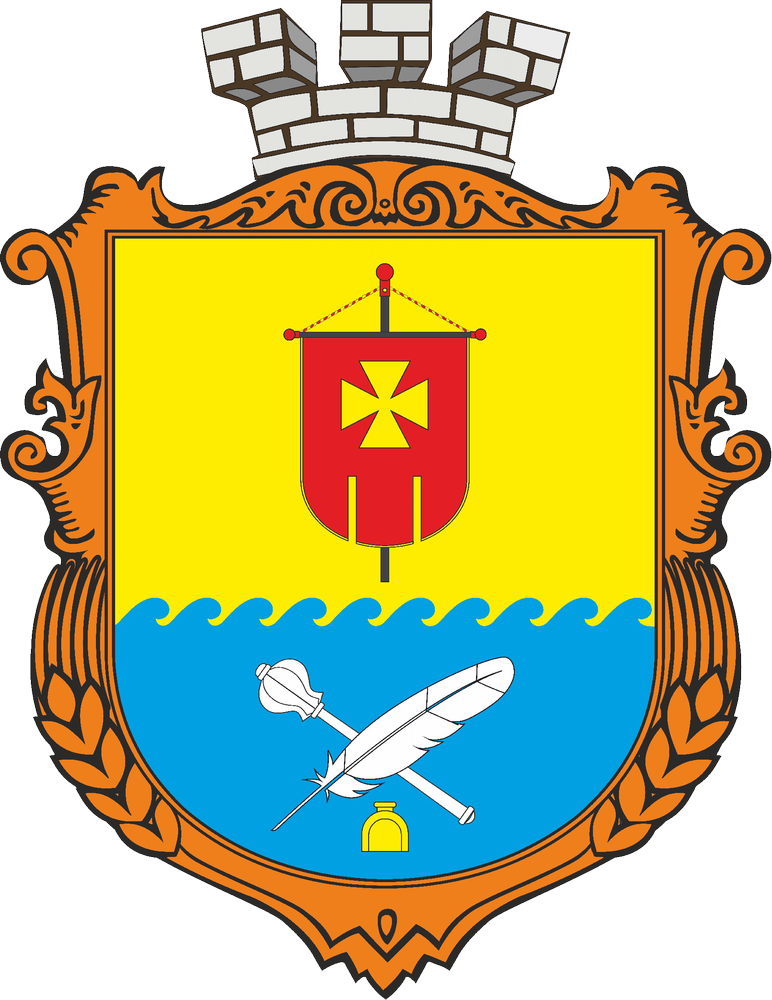
- Flag Coat of arms

- Location within Chernihiv Oblast Location within Ukraine
- Coordinates: 50°52′37″N 32°38′29″E
- Country: Ukraine
- Oblast: Chernihiv Oblast
- Raion: Pryluky Raion

Population (2022)
  - Total: 2,169
- Time zone: UTC+2 (EET)
  - Summer (DST): UTC+3 (EEST)

Parafiivka (Ukrainian: Парафіївка; Russian: Парафиевка) is a rural settlement in Pryluky Raion, Chernihiv Oblast, northern Ukraine. It hosts the administration of Parafiivka settlement hromada, one of the hromadas of Ukraine. Population: 2,169 (2022).

== History ==
Until 18 July 2020, Parafiivka belonged to Ichnia Raion. The raion was abolished in July 2020 as part of the administrative reform of Ukraine, which reduced the number of raions of Chernihiv Oblast to five. The area of Ichnia Raion was merged into Pryluky Raion.

Until 26 January 2024, Parafiivka was designated urban-type settlement. On this day, a new law entered into force which abolished this status, and Parafiivka became a rural settlement.

== Geography ==
The Parafiivka is located in the north of Pryluky raion, 150 km from Chernihiv, 20 km from Ichna, and 55 km from Pryluky. The height above sea level is 164 m. The territory of the settlement located within the Dnieper Lowland. The relief of the Parafiivka surface is a lowland plain, in places dissected by river valleys. There are many ponds in Parafiivka.

The climate of Parafiivka is moderately continental, with warm summers and relatively mild winters. The average temperature in January is about -7 °C, and in July - +19 °C. The average annual precipitation ranges from 550 to 660 mm, with the highest amount of precipitation in the summer period.

The soil cover of the settlement is dominated by chernozem and podzolized soils. The Parafiivka is located the forest steppe, on the Polesia.

== Economy ==
=== Transportation ===
Kochanovka railway station, located in Parafiivka, is a terminal station of the Bakhmach-Pryluky railway.

Regional highways to Ichnia pass through Parafiivka, as well as the state Highway H08, connecting Kyiv and Sumy.
