= Lord =

Title for a person or deity

Lord is an appellation for a person or deity who has authority, control, or power over others, acting as a master, chief, or ruler. The appellation can also denote certain persons who hold a title of the peerage in the United Kingdom, or are entitled to courtesy titles. The collective "Lords" can refer to a group or body of peers.

== Etymology ==
The Old English word 'hlaford' evolved into 'lord'.

According to the Oxford Dictionary of English, the etymology of the word can be traced back to the Old English word hlāford which originated from hlāfweard meaning "loaf-ward" or "bread-keeper", reflecting the Germanic tribal custom of a chieftain providing food for his followers. The appellation "lord" is primarily applied to men, while for women the appellation "lady" is used. This is no longer universal: the Lord of Mann, a title previously held by the Queen of the United Kingdom, and female Lord Mayors are examples of women who are styled as "Lord".

== Historical usage ==
=== Feudalism ===
Under the feudal system, "lord" had a wide, loose and varied meaning. An overlord was a person from whom a landholding or a manor was held by a mesne lord or vassal under various forms of feudal land tenure. The modern term "landlord" is a vestigial survival of this function. A liege lord was a person to whom a vassal owed sworn allegiance. Neither of these terms were titular dignities, but rather factual appellations, which described the relationship between two or more persons within the highly stratified feudal social system. For example, a man might be lord of the manor to his own tenants but also a vassal of his own overlord, who in turn was a vassal of the King. Where a knight was a lord of the manor, he was referred to in contemporary documents as "John (Surname), knight, lord of (manor name)". A feudal baron was a true titular dignity, with the right to attend Parliament, but a feudal baron, Lord of the Manor of many manors, was a vassal of the King.

=== Manors ===
The courtesy title (Note: The holder is still known as Mr. Lord of the Manor as a title goes after one's legal name it's a courtesy title not substantive it does not replace one's legal surname in a passport i.e. Mr Joe Bloggs, Lord of the Manor.) of "lord of the manor" came into use in the English medieval system of feudalism after the Norman Conquest of 1066. The title "Lord of the Manor" was a titular feudal dignity which derived its force from the existence and operation of a manorial court or court baron at which he or his steward presided, thus he was the lord of the manorial court which determined the rules and laws which were to govern all the inhabitants and property covered by the jurisdiction of the court. To the tenants of a certain class of manor known in Saxon times as Infangenthef their lord was a man who had the power of exercising capital punishment over them. The term invariably used in contemporary mediaeval documents is simply "lord of X", X being the name of the manor. The term "Lord of the Manor" is a recent usage of historians to distinguish such lords from feudal barons and other powerful persons referred to in ancient documents variously as "Sire" (mediaeval French), "Dominus" (Latin), "Lord" etc.

=== Laird ===
The Scottish title Laird is a shortened form of 'laverd' which is an old Scottish word deriving from an Anglo-Saxon term meaning 'Lord' and is also derived from the middle English word 'Lard' also meaning 'Lord'. The word is generally used to refer to any owner of a landed estate and has no meaning in heraldic terms and its use is not controlled by the Lord Lyon.

== Modern usage ==
=== Substantive title ===
Lord is occasionally used as part of a substantive British noble title in its own right:

In the Peerage of Scotland, the members of the lowest level of the peerage have the substantive title "Lord of Parliament" rather than Baron.

The heir to the throne in Scotland holds the title Lord of the Isles in the Baronage of Scotland, a non-peerage rank of nobility.

In England, the title Lord of the Isle of Wight used to exist but fell out of use before the creation of the modern peerage system.

The British sovereign is also accorded the title Lord of Mann as head of state of the Isle of Mann.

The feudal title of "Lord of the Manor" is still recognised by the British Government for any such title registered at His Majesty's Land Registry before 13 October 2003 (the commencement date of the Land Registration Act 2002) but after that date titles can no longer be registered, and any such titles voluntarily de-registered by the holder cannot later be re-registered. However, any transfer of ownership of registered manors will continue to be recorded in the register, on the appropriate notification. Thus in effect the register is closed for new registrations. Such titles are legally classified as "incorporeal hereditaments" as they have no physical existence, and usually have no intrinsic value. However, a lucrative market arose in the 20th century for such titles, often for purposes of vanity, which was assisted by the existence of an official register, giving the purchaser the impression of a physical existence. Whether a title of "Lord of the Manor" is registered or unregistered has no effect on its legal validity or existence, which is a matter of law to be determined by the courts. Modern legal cases have been won by persons claiming rights as lords of the manor over village greens. The heads of many ancient English land-owning families have continued to be lords of the manor of lands they have inherited. The UK Identity and Passport Service will include such titles on a British passport as an "observation" (e.g., 'The Holder is the Lord of the Manor of X'), provided the holder can provide documentary evidence of ownership. The United States forbids the use of all titles on passports. Australia forbids the use of titles on passports if those titles have not been awarded by the Crown (in reference to the Australian Monarchy) or the Commonwealth (in reference to the Australian Government).

=== Peers and children of peers ===
Lord is used as a generic term to denote members of the peerage. Five ranks of peer exist in the United Kingdom: in descending order these are duke, marquess, earl, viscount, and baron. The appellation "Lord" is used most often by barons, who are rarely addressed by their formal and legal title of "Baron". The most formal style is "The Lord (X)": for example, Alfred Tennyson, 1st Baron Tennyson, can be referred to as "The Lord Tennyson", although the most common appellation is "Lord Tennyson". Marquesses, earls and viscounts are commonly also addressed as Lord. Dukes use the style "The Duke of (X)", and are not correctly referred to as "Lord (X)". Dukes are formally addressed as "Your Grace", rather than "My Lord".

"Lord" is also used as a courtesy title for younger sons of a British prince, duke, or marquesses, in the style "Lord (first name) (surname)". The eldest son of a peer would be entitled to use one of his father's subsidiary titles (if any). For example, Prince Edward, Duke of Kent holds the subsidiary title of Earl of St Andrews, which is used by his elder son George Windsor, Earl of St Andrews, while his younger son is styled Lord Nicholas Windsor. However, if the father has no subsidiary title, the older son will assume a courtesy title of "Lord (last name)", such as in the case of the Earl of Devon. As these forms of address are merely courtesy titles, the holder is not actually a member of the peerage and is not entitled to use the definite article "The" as part of the title.

=== House of Lords ===
The upper house of the Parliament of the United Kingdom is the House of Lords, which is an abbreviation of the full title, "The Right Honourable the Lords Spiritual and Temporal in Parliament Assembled". The Lords Temporal are the people who are entitled to receive writs of summons to attend the House of Lords in right of a peerage. The Lords Spiritual are the Archbishops of Canterbury and York, the Bishops of London, Winchester and Durham, and the twenty-one longest-serving bishops of the Church of England from among the other bishops (plus some female bishops of shorter service in consequence of the Lords Spiritual (Women) Act 2015), who are all entitled to receive writs of summons in right of their bishoprics or archbishoprics.

The Lords Temporal greatly outnumber the Lords Spiritual, there being 767 of the former as of July 2026, but typically only 26 of the latter. As of July 2026, 6 Lords Temporal sit in right of judicial life peerages under the Appellate Jurisdiction Act 1876, with the remainder sitting as life peers under the Life Peerages Act 1958.

=== Judiciary ===
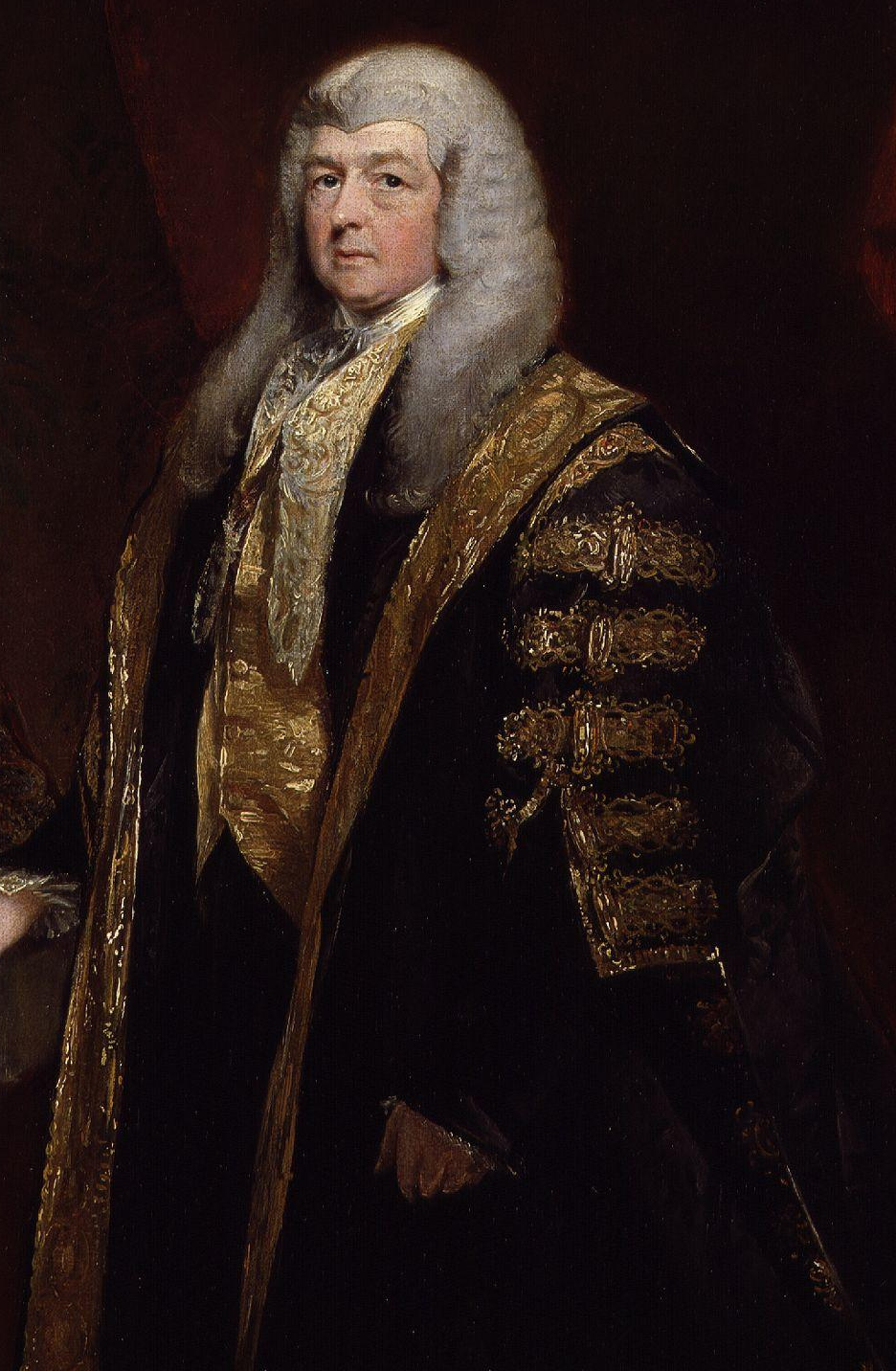
Charles Pepys, 1st Earl of Cottenham, a Lord Chancellor of the United Kingdom

Until the creation of the Supreme Court of the United Kingdom (2009), certain judges sat in the House of Lords by virtue of holding life peerages. Most of them (those who were members of the Appellate Committee) were known collectively as the Law Lords. All judges, including former Law Lords, lost the right to sit and vote in the House of Lords, despite retaining their life peerages, upon creation of the Supreme Court. The appellation "Lord", though not the style, is also used to refer to some judges in certain Commonwealth legal systems, who are not peers. Some such judges, for instance judges of the Court of Appeal of England and Wales, are called "Lord Justice". Other Commonwealth judges, for example judges of Canadian provincial supreme courts, are known only as Justices but are addressed with deference in court as 'My Lord', 'My Lady', 'Your Lordship' or 'Your Ladyship'.

Examples of judges who use the appellation "lord" include:

- Justices of the Supreme Court of the United Kingdom not holding peerages, who are addressed as if they were life peers by Royal Warrant. Wives of male justices who are not peers are addressed as if they were wives of peers. These forms of address are applicable both in court and in social contexts.
- Judges of the Court of Appeal of England and Wales, known as 'Lords Justices of Appeal'.
- Judges of the Scottish Court of Session, known as 'Lords of Council and Session'.
- Justices of the Canadian provincial Supreme Courts, addressed in Court as "My Lord" or "My Lady" and referred to in legal literature as "Lordships" or "Ladyships".
- Judges of the Supreme Court of India and the High Courts of India, who are addressed as "My Lord" and "Your Lordship" in court. The Bar Council of India called upon lawyers to give up this practice of addressing judges as 'lords' in 2006 but in practice, this was ignored.

=== Naval ===
The Board of Admiralty (1628–1964) was established in 1628 when Charles I put the office of Lord High Admiral into commission. The title Naval Lord to the Board of Admiralty was first used around the 1600s. These were a body of Senior Admirals, first called Naval Lord Commissioners, then Naval Lords then Professional Naval Lords then Sea Lords. The President of the Board was known as the First Lord of the Admiralty (with the other five Naval appointments being the Second Sea Lord, Third Sea Lord, etc. sequentially), or sometimes First Lord Commissioner of the Admiralty. With the abolition of the Board of Admiralty and its merger into the Ministry of Defence in 1964, formal control of the Navy was taken over by the Admiralty Board of the Defence Council of the United Kingdom, with the day-to-day running of the Navy taken over by the Navy Board. The office of Lord High Admiral was vested in the Crown (i.e. in the person of the current British monarch) and that of First Lord of the Admiralty ceased to exist, but the First, Second and Third Sea Lords retained their titles, despite ceasing to be Lords Commissioners of the Admiralty. To this day (2023) the first two senior officers of the Royal Navy are still known as First Sea Lord and Chief of the Naval Staff, and Second Sea Lord and Deputy Chief of Naval Staff.

The Lords Commissioners were entitled collectively to be known as "The Right Honourable the Lords Commissioners of the Admiralty", and were commonly referred to collectively as "Their Lordships" or "My Lords Commissioners of the Admiralty", though individual members were not entitled to these styles. More informally, they were known in short as "The Lords of the Admiralty". The Lords of the Admiralty are not peers.

=== Ecclesiastical ===
In Great Britain and Ireland, and in most countries that are members or former members of the Commonwealth, bishops may be addressed as "My Lord" or "My Lord Bishop" or "Your Lordship", particularly on formal occasions. This usage is not restricted to those bishops who sit in the House of Lords. Indeed, by custom, it is not restricted to bishops of the Church of England but applies to bishops of the Church in Wales, the Scottish Episcopal Church, and the Roman Catholic Church, and may be applied (though less commonly) to bishops of other Christian denominations. It has become more common to use simply the one word "Bishop".

In the United States, bishops are addressed as "Excellency".

=== Other high offices of state ===
Various other high offices of state in the United Kingdom, Commonwealth and Republic of Ireland are prefixed with the deferential appellation of "lord".

These include:

- Great Officers of State (United Kingdom) such as Lord Chancellor, Lord Privy Seal, and Lord President of the Council
- Council officials such as Lord Mayor in England or Lord provost in Scotland.
- Royal representatives, such as the Lord-lieutenant and Lord High Commissioner to the General Assembly of the Church of Scotland
- Heraldic officials such as the Lord Lyon King of Arms

Holders of these offices are not ex officio peers, although the holders of some of the offices were in the past always peers.

== Non-English equivalents ==
In most cultures in Europe an equivalent appellation denoting deference exists. The French term Mon Seigneur ("My Lord"), shortened to the modern French Monsieur, derives directly from the Latin seniorem, meaning "elder, senior". From this Latin source derived directly also the Italian Signore, the Spanish Señor, the Portuguese Senhor.

Non-Romance languages have their own equivalents. Of the Germanic family there is the Dutch Meneer/Mijnheer/De Heer (as in: aan de heer Joren Jansen), German and Swedish Herr, and Danish and Norwegian Herre. All three of these stem from a Germanic title of respect (in this case, from the Proto-Germanic root *haira-, "hoary, venerable, grey", likely a loan translation of Latin seniorem).

Finnic languages have their own versions: Finnish uses herra and Estonian uses härra, both of which are considered loanwords from Scandinavian languages. In other European languages there is Welsh Arglwydd, Hungarian Úr, Greek Kyrie, Polish Pan, Czech pán, Breton Aotrou, and Albanian Zoti.

In several Indian languages there are the Hindi Swami, Prabhu, Thakur, Samprabhu (Overlord) and also words like Saheb or Laat Saheb from Lord Saheb were once used but have changed in meaning now, Telugu Prabhuvu, Tamil Koman, Kannada Dore, Bengali Probhu, Gujarati Swami, Punjabi Su'āmī, Nepali Prabhu. Words like Swami and Prabhu are Sanskrit-origin words, common in many Indian languages.

A Japanese daimyo was the equivalent of European peers of the realm, and entitled to be styled kakka (閣下), referred to with their name appended with -sama (様), or -kimi (君), or simply referred to as tono (殿) by retainers and other familiar subordinates. Non-landed gentry could also be referred to with their name appended with -sama (様), while a lady could be referred to as hime (姫).

Philippine languages have different words for "lord", some of which are cognates. Tagalog has Panginoón for "lord" in both the noble and the religious senses. Its root, ginoo, is also found in Visayan languages like Cebuano as the term for "lord". Ginoo is also the Tagalog root for Ginoóng, the modern equivalent of the English term "Mister" (akin to how Romance language terms like señor may be glossed as either "lord", "mister", or "sir"). Ilocano meanwhile employs Apo for "Lord" in religious contexts; it is a particle that generally accords respect to an addressee of higher status than the speaker.

In the Yoruba language of West Africa, the words Olu and Oluwa are used in much the same way as the English term. Olodumare, the Yoruba conception of God Almighty, is often referred to using either of these two words. In the Yoruba chieftaincy system, meanwhile, the Oluwo of Iwo's royal title translates to "Lord of Iwo". In Lagos, the Oluwa of Lagos is one of that kingdom's most powerful chiefs.

== Religion ==
English speakers use the word "Lord" (generally with an initial upper-case letter) as a title of deference for various gods or deities. The earliest recorded use of "Lord" in the English language in a religious context occurred in the work of English writers such as Bede (c. 673–735). However, Bede wrote in Latin (Note: Bede could refer to Jesus in Latin as Dominus, for example in De temporibus: "Dominus nascitur" (the Lord was born) The Latin word dominus, originally associated with the master of a household, acquired conotations of "master", "owner" (of slaves, for example) and eventually of "lord" and "ruler".) (Michael Lapidge describes him as "without question the most accomplished Latinist produced in these islands in the Anglo-Saxon period"). He used an Anglo-Saxon phrase that indicated a noble, prince, ruler or lord to refer to God; however, he applied this as a gloss to the Latin text that he was producing, and not as a clear translation of the term itself. "Lord", as a gloss to Old English dryhten, meant "royal", "ruler", "prince", or "noble", and did not indicate a deity. After the 11th-century Norman invasion of England and the influx of Norman-French-speaking clerics, this semantic field began to appear in religious texts as well, but that occurred during the later Middle Ages and not in Bede's early medieval period. The word "Lord" appears frequently in the King James Bible of the early 17th century. See also the article Jesus is Lord.

- English-language Old Testament translations such as the King James Version usually render the Hebrew name YHWH (the Tetragrammaton) as "the LORD" with small caps. This usage follows the Jewish practice of substituting the spoken Hebrew word "Adonai" ("My Lords") for appearances of YHWH.
- In Christianity, New Testament translations into English often refer to Jesus as "Lord" or "the Lord", translating Greek κύριος.
- In Aramaic, the title Mar, which means "Lord", is used for saints, ecclesiastical figures, and Jesus.
- Semitic religions gave other deities appellations corresponding to "Lord" including:
  - Baʿal ("Lord"), as used by the Canaanites both as a generic term of address to various local deities and as the spoken name for the storm god Baʿal Haddu once the form "Hadad" became too sacred for any but his high priest to utter.
  - Similarly, Tammuz came to be addressed as "Adoni" ("My Lord").
- In the non-Semitic Sumerian culture, En means "Lord", as in the names of Sumerian deities such as Enki and Enlil.
- In Buddhism, Gautama Buddha is often called "Lord Buddha".
- In Jainism, "Lord" refers to the Mahavira.
- In Ancient Greece, the name Adonis was a form of the Semitic Adoni.
- In Old Norse, the names Freyr and Freya may have the etymological meaning "Lord" and "Lady" respectively.
- The Wiccan God is often referred to as "The Lord" and the Wiccan Goddess as "The Lady", or in the combination "Lord and Lady" (in this form, the definite article "the" is usually omitted), usually in reference to a mythological pairing such as Cernunos and Cerridwen.
- Believers in Mormonism regard Jesus as the YHVH (Jehovah) of the Old Testament in his pre-mortal existence, and since that name is translated as "the Lord" in the King James Bible, in Mormonism "the Lord" refers to Jesus. Elohim, seen as a separate individual who is the father of Jesus, is generally referred to by Mormons as "God" or "Heavenly Father". (See Mormon cosmology for references.)
- In Hindu theology, the Svayam Bhagavan may refer to the concept of the Absolute representation of the monotheistic God. Another name more commonly used in Hindu theology is Ishvara, meaning "The Lord", the personal god consisting of the trinity of Brahma, Vishnu, and Shiva. In common parlance, 'Lord' is used before many deities, for example, Lord Shiva, Lord Ganesha, Lord Rama etc. as a translation of "Shri".
- Islam: The English term "Lord" often translates the Arabic term rabb (Arabic: رب).

== Titles ==
Historical usage

- Europe:
  - Lord Bishop
  - Lord High Admiral of the United Kingdom
  - Lord High Constable
  - Lord High Steward
  - Lord High Treasurer
  - Lord Protector
- Asia:
  - Nguyễn lords
  - Trịnh lords

Present usage:

- Lord Chamberlain
- Lord Chancellor
- Lord Commissioner of Justiciary
- Lord High Admiral
- Lord Justice Clerk
- Lord Marshal
- Lord mayor
- Lord of Council and Session
- Lord of the Isles
- Lord of the Treasury
- Lord President of the Court of Session
- Lord provost
- Lord Rector
- Lord Steward

== See also ==
- Forms of address in the United Kingdom
- Heerlijkheid
- Lord's Prayer
- Milord
- False titles of nobility
