= Vilshana =

Vilshana (Ukrainian: Вільшана) is the name of several small settlements in Ukraine:

- Vilshana, Cherkasy Oblast
- Vilshana, Kharkiv Oblast
- Vilshana, Sumy Oblast
- The former name of Olshana, Chernihiv Oblast

== See also ==
- Vilshany
