= Avhustivka, Chernihiv Oblast =

Village in Chernihiv Oblast, Ukraine

Avhustivka Августівка
- Village
- Avhustivka
- Interactive map of Avhustivka
- Location within Chernihiv Oblast Location within Ukraine
- Coordinates: 50°47′02″N 32°21′56″E
- Country: Ukraine
- Oblast: Chernihiv Oblast
- Raion: Pryluky Raion
- Hromada: Ichnia urban hromada
- Established: 1800

Area
  - Total: 0.14 km^{2} (0.054 sq mi)

Population (2001)
  - Total: 218
  - Density: 1,600/km^{2} (4,000/sq mi)
- Time zone: UTC+2 (EET (Kyiv))
  - Summer (DST): UTC+3 (EEST)
- Postal code: 16702

Avhustivka (Ukrainian: Августівка) is a village in Pryluky Raion, Chernihiv Oblast, Ukraine. It belongs to Ichnia urban hromada, one of the hromadas of Ukraine.

== History ==
Avhustivka was founded in 1800. In 1869, it appeared on a map as a farmstead without a name at the time. In 1911, the Avhustivka had a population of 162 people.

Until 18 July 2020, Avhustivka belonged to Ichnia Raion. The raion was abolished on 18 July 2020 as part of the administrative reform of Ukraine, which reduced the number of raions of Chernihiv Oblast to five. The area of Ichnia Raion was merged into Pryluky Raion.

According to the decision of the National Commission for State Language Standards dated 22 June 2023, the village of Avhustivka was included in the list of settlements that may not comply with the lexical norms of the Ukrainian language, in particular, related to Russian imperial policy (Russian colonial policy). The community is recommended to substantiate the expediency of keeping the current name or to propose a new name in accordance with the procedure established by law.
