= Avhustivka =

Avhustivka (Ukrainian: Августівка) may refer to the following places in Ukraine:

- Avhustivka, Chernihiv Oblast, village in Pryluky Raion
- Avhustivka, Odesa Oblast, village in Odesa Raion
- Avhustivka, Ternopil Oblast, village in Ternopil Raion
