= Lord Marshall =

Lord Marshall may refer to:

- Horace Brooks Marshall, 1st Baron Marshall of Chipstead (1865–1936), British publisher, newspaper distributor and Lord Mayor of London
- Frank Marshall, Baron Marshall of Leeds (1915–1990), leader of Leeds City Council
- Walter Marshall, Baron Marshall of Goring (1932–1996), British physicist and chairman of the Central Electricity Generating Board
- Colin Marshall, Baron Marshall of Knightsbridge (1933–2012), chairman and chief executive officer of British Airways

== See also ==
- Lord Marshal (disambiguation)
