= Pryluky Regiment =

Pryluky Regiment Прилуцький полк
- Coat of Arms of the regimental centre
- Active: 1648 - 1782
- Country: Cossack Hetmanate
- Type: Cossack Regiment
- Size: 20 sotnias, 1996 Cossacks (1649); 8 sotnias (1720); 11 sotnias (1782)
- Garrison/HQ: Pryluky, Left-bank Ukraine
- Engagements: Khmelnytsky Uprising; Battle of Berestechko; Russo-Polish War (1654–67)

Commanders
- Notable commanders: Petro Doroshenko

Chyhyryn Regiment Прилуцький полк (Ukrainian)
- Regiment of Cossack Hetmanate
- 1648–1782
- Coat of arms

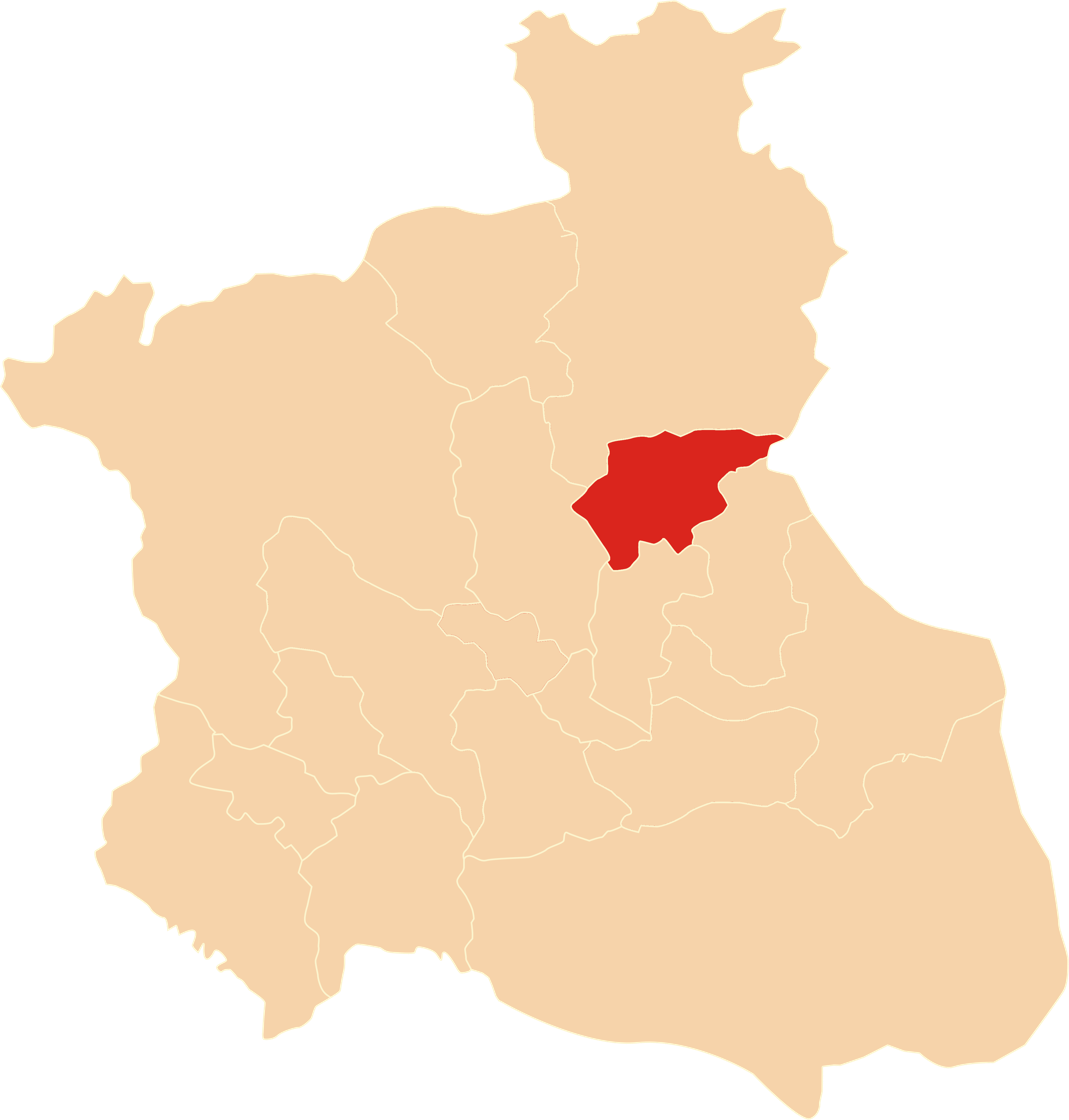
- The regiment's territory in 1660 (red)
- Capital: Pryluky
- History
  - Khmelnytsky Uprising: 1648
  - Creation of Chernigov Viceroyalty: 1782
Preceded by	Succeeded by
Kiev Voivodeship	Chernigov Governorate
- Today part of: Ukraine

The Pryluky Regiment was one of the seventeen territorial-administrative subdivisions of the Hetman State. The regiment's capital was the city of Pryluky, now in the Chernihiv Oblast, north-central Ukraine.

== History ==
The regiment was created during the Khmelnytsky Uprising. Following the signing of the Treaty of Zboriv in 1649 it consisted a total of 21 companies, and had 2,100 registered Cossacks. During the uprising the regiment took part in the Battle of Berestechko in 1651. In 1657 Petro Doroshenko was appointed colonel of Pryluky. The regiment was involved in successfully suppressing Martyn Pushkar's revolt against the Vyhovsky government.

When a civil war emerged among the cossacks the Hetmanate was split along the Dnieper River into Left-bank Ukraine and Right-bank Ukraine, which placed the regiment under the control of Left-bank hetmans. After the Treaty of Andrusovo in 1667, the Tsardom of Russia gained sovereignty over Left-bank Ukraine and its regiments came under the administration of Russian tsar.

In 1766-1769 Cossacks of Pryluky Regiment petitioned empress Catherine II to restore the position of hetman in a letter to her legislative commission. In 1782 the regiment had 11 companies and a population of 69,200. In 1782 the regiment was disbanded by the order of the Empress Catherine the Great. All of the regiment's territories were included into the Chernigov Governorate.

== Administrative subdivisions ==
According to the 1649 Registry of the Zaporozhian Host the regiment included sotnias based in the following geographic locations:

- Pryluky (2)
- Varva (2)
- Sribne
- Divytsia
- Halytsia
- Perevolochna
- Ichnia (2)
- Horodnia
- Ivanytsia
- Monastyryshche
- Karabutove
- Krasne
- Holinka
- Hurivka
- Kropyvne

== Map ==
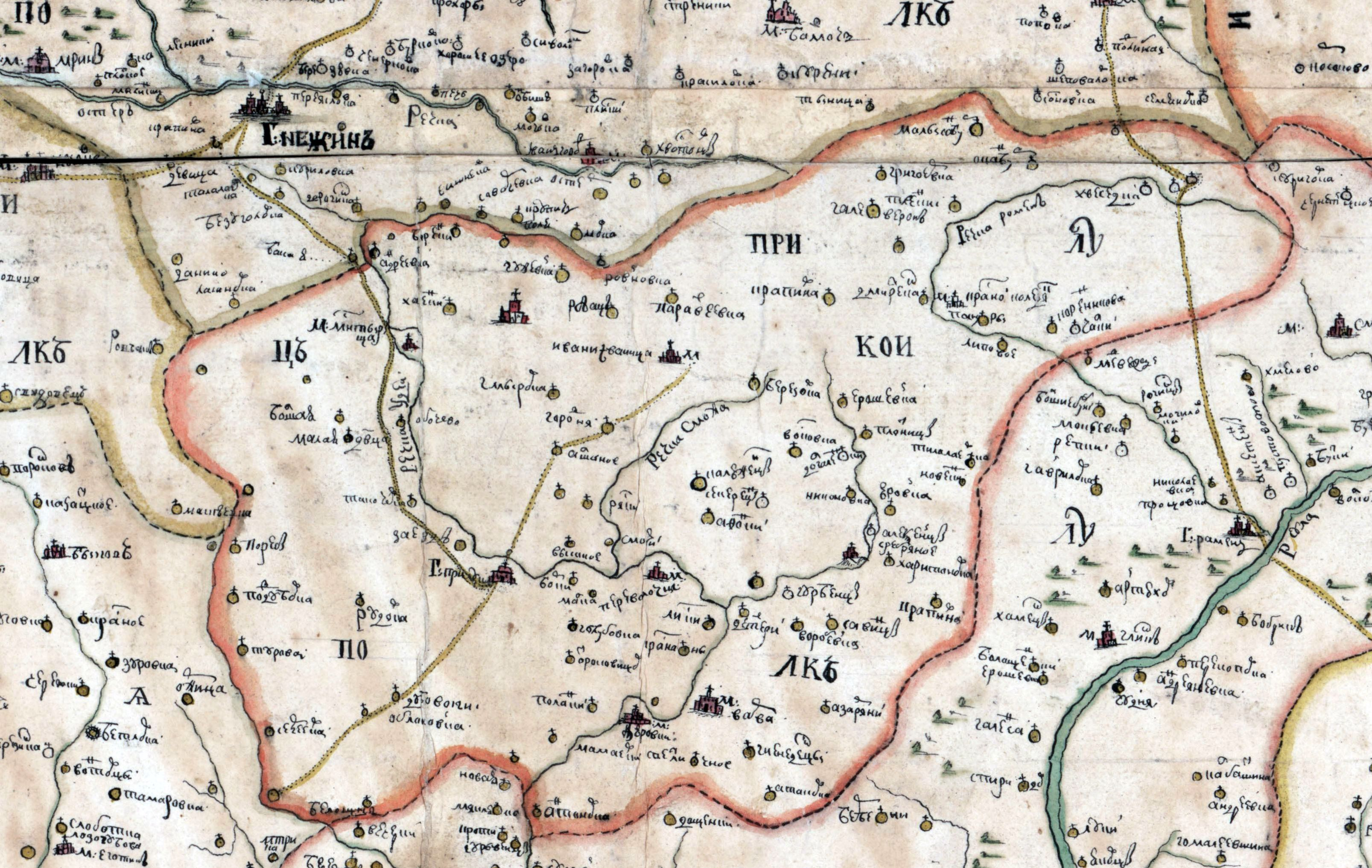
Pryluky Regiment in mid-18th century
