= Horodnia, Pryluky Raion, Chernihiv Oblast =

Horodnia Городня
- Village
- Location of Horodnia within Ukraine Horodnia (Ukraine)
- Coordinates: 50.758°N 32.527°E
- Country: Ukraine
- Oblast: Chernihiv Oblast
- Raion: Pryluky Raion
- Founded: 1600

Area
  - Total: 3,949 km^{2} (1,525 sq mi)
- Elevation: 141 m (463 ft)

Population (2001 census)
  - Total: 511
  - Density: 0.129/km^{2} (0.335/sq mi)
- Time zone: UTC+2 (EET)
  - Summer (DST): UTC+3 (EEST)
- Postal code: 16752
- Area code: +380 4633

Horodnia is a village in Pryluky Raion, Chernihiv Oblast, Ukraine. It belongs to Ichnia urban hromada, one of the hromadas of Ukraine. The population is about 448 people.

Until 18 July 2020, Horodnia belonged to Ichnia Raion. The raion was abolished in July 2020 as part of the administrative reform of Ukraine, which reduced the number of raions of Chernihiv Oblast to five. The area of Ichnia Raion was merged into Pryluky Raion.

The remains of the settlement (Hillfort) site of the Kievan Rus' period (IX-XIII centuries) have been preserved on the territory of the village. The village was found in its mid-seventeenth century. In 1648 the Cossack Sotnia was established in the village, which was part of the Pryluks regiment.
