= Lord Marshal =

Lord Marshal may refer to one of the following

- Lord Marshal of England
- Earl Marischal
- Lord Marshal (Sweden) (Swedish: Lantmarskalk) was in Sweden before 1866 the presiding officer for the nobles in the Riksdag of the Estates
  - That title was also used in the Grand Duchy of Finland by the presiding officer in the Finnish House of Nobility and as their speaker in the Diet
- The chairman of the Estländische Ritterschaft in Estonia

== In fiction ==
- The leader of the Necromonger army in The Chronicles of Riddick (franchise) universe
- In the popular medieval literary conception, the Lord Marshal Sir Brastias was said to have served under King Arthur.

== See also ==
- Lord Marshall (disambiguation)
- Marshal (disambiguation)
- Marshal of Nobility (disambiguation)
