= Vasyl Chumak =

Ukrainian writer and communist revolutionary (1901–1919)

- Василь Григорович Чумак
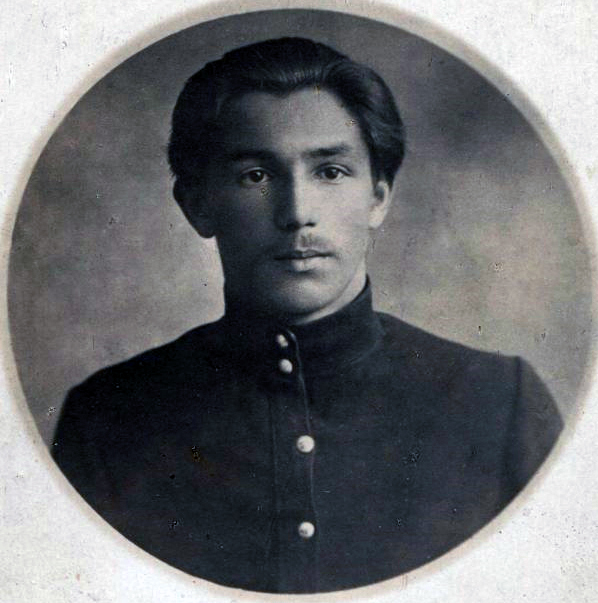
- Born: 7 January 1901; Ichnia, Russian Empire (now Ukraine)
- Died: 21 November 1919 (aged 18); Kyiv, Ukraine
- Resting place: Park of Eternal Glory
- Writing career
- Pen name: S. Viche; Vahr; M. Ichnia; V. Ch.; S. V.; Chornenko
- Period: 1917–1919
- Literary movement: Romanticism, Impressionism

Vasyl Hryhorovych Chumak (Note: Chumak also wrote under multiple literary pseudonyms, including S. Viche (С. Віче), M. Ichnia (М. Ічня), and Chornenko (Чорненко).) (Ukrainian: Васи́ль Григо́рович Чума́к; 7 January 1901 [O.S. 25 December 1900] – 21 November 1919) was a Ukrainian writer and communist revolutionary.

== Biography ==
Vasyl Hryhorovych Chumak was born on 7 January 1901 in the town of Ichnia, Chernigov Governorate. His father was the Cossack-descended Hryhorii Semenovych Chumak, while his mother was Anastasiia Petrivna Chumak (née Marchenko), of landlord stock. The family held six desiatiny of land in the region, including a bakery and a bread factory.

Chumak undertook his early education at a religious school, before studying at Ichnia's high school between 1910 and 1914. He next studied in Horodnia, where he finished gymnasium in 1918. After graduating he travelled to the Ukrainian capital of Kyiv, where he joined the Borotbists. As a Borotbist, Chumak was secretary of the party's journal, Artwork, and he also worked in the All-Ukrainian Literary Collegium of the Ministry of Education of the Ukrainian Soviet Socialist Republic.

Following the takeover of Kyiv by the White Army Chumak began organising a pro-communist resistance organisation, alongside Hnat Mykhailychenko. The two were soon arrested, and, while attempting to escape from captivity, were both shot to death. Following the Soviet capture of Kyiv, both of their bodies were reburied in a mass grave on Anosov Square (now the Park of Eternal Glory).

== Works ==
Chumak's works, first created in 1917 and encouraged by his interest in the writings of Taras Shevchenko, took on a romanticist and revolutionary character, and he wrote in several forms, including prose, stories, essays, literary criticism, and published articles. In his poetry, Chumak was an impressionist, and through his works expressed support for Ukrainian independence and communism. Following Chumak's death, a poetry collection was released under the title Prelude (Ukrainian: Заспів, romanized: Zaspiv). Chumak was responsible for the establishment of several journals, as well as the Ichnia branch of the Prosvita society.

== Legacy ==
Ukrainian literary critic Volodymyr Koriak wrote in the 1920s that Chumak, alongside Mykhailychenko, Vasyl Ellan-Blakytny, and Andrii Zalyvchyi, comprised a group he described as "the first braves", responsible for the development of Ukrainian communist literature. Chumak's works were banned from the early 1930s as part of a broader crackdown by the government of the Soviet Union on the Borotbists. In the 1950s he was rehabilitated, and his works were again permitted.
