= Bakhmach urban hromada =

Bakhmach urban hromada Бахмацька міська громада
- Hromada
- Coat of arms
- Interactive map of Bakhmach urban hromada
- Country: Ukraine
- Oblast: Chernihiv
- Raion: Nizhyn

Area
  - Total: 720.9 km^{2} (278.3 sq mi)

Population (2024)
  - Total: 28,406
  - Density: 39.40/km^{2} (102.1/sq mi)
- CATOTTG code: UA74040030000093042
- Settlements: 40
- Cities: 1
- Rural settlements: 3
- Villages: 36
- Website: bakhmach-mr.gov.ua

Bakhmach urban hromada (Ukrainian: Бахмацька міська громада) is a hromada of Ukraine, located in Nizhyn Raion, Chernihiv Oblast. Its administrative center is the city Bakhmach.

It has an area of 720.9 square kilometres (278.3 mi^{2}) and a population of 28,406, as of 2024.

== Composition ==
The hromada contains 39 settlements: 1 city (Bakhmach), 35 villages:

- Bakhmach
- Bezpechne
- Bilovezhi Druhi
- Bilovezhi Pershi
- Varvarivka
- Vyshneve
- Vyshneve
- Vyshnivske
- Hlyboke
- Hryhorivka
- Hrushivka
- Zaporizhzhya
- Zarukavne
- Zelenivka
- Kalynivka
- Kalchynivka
- Koshmaliv
- Krasylivka
- Kulishove
- Kurin
- Movchyniv
- Oleksiivka
- Opolonske
- Osynivka
- Ostriv
- Pashkiv
- Pershe Travnia
- Pisky
- Strelnyky
- Tynytsia
- Ukrainka
- Fastivtsi
- Khalimonove
- Shevchenko
- Shumeykiv

And 3 rural-type settlements: Vesele, Peremoha, and Cheremushki.

== Geography ==
The Bakhmach urban hromada is located in the east part of Chernihiv Oblast. It borders Sumy Oblast.The distance to the regional center by railway is 153 km, by highways 145 km.

The territory of the Bakhmach urban hromada is located within the Dnieper Lowland. The relief of the district's surface is a lowland plain, in places dissected by river valleys. All rivers belong to the Dnieper basin. The Bakhmach urban hromada is located on the left bank of the Desna River. In the floodplains of the rivers there are oxbow lake forests and lowland swamps.There is a network of ponds in the hromada, consisting of 62 units with a total area of 122.3 hectares.

The climate of Bakhmach urban hromada is moderately continental, with warm summers and relatively mild winters. The average temperature in January is about −7 °C, and in July― +19 °C. The average annual precipitation ranges from 550 to 660 mm, with the highest amount of precipitation in the summer period.

The soil cover of the hromada is dominated by chernozem and swamps soils. The Bakhmach urban hromada is located in the natural zone of the forest steppe, in Polissya. The main species in the forests are oak, alder, ash, and birch. Minerals raion: peat, sand, clay.

== Economy ==
The leading sectors of the Bakhmach urban hromada economy are agriculture, food industry, and forestry. Agriculture specializes in growing grain and industrial crops, cattle breeding, and pig breeding.

=== Transportation ===
The railway tracks of the South-Western Railway pass through the Bakhmach urban hromada in the direction of Chernihiv-Pryluky-Bakhmach and Hlukhiv-Kyiv. On the territory of the city of Bakhmach there are railway stations: Bakhmach - Passenger, Bakhmach - Kyiv, Bakhmach - Gomel and a railway station in the village of Hryhorivka.The state highways M01 and M02 pass through the territory of the hromada.

== See also ==
- List of hromadas of Ukraine
