= Marshal of Nobility (Estonia) =

Title of the official in Estonia and Livonia

In the provinces of Estonia and Livonia of the Russian Empire, the title of the senior official was (Provincial) Marshal of Nobility (Estonian: (Kubermangu) Aadlimarssal) during 1783–1796, when regency for the provinces of Estonia and Livonia was introduced. Subsequently, Russian emperor Paul I restored the previous administrative organization for Estonia and Livonia.

== Provincial Marshals of Nobility of Estonia (1783–1796) ==
- 1783–1786 Moritz Engelbrecht von Kursell (1744–1799) (de:Moritz Engelbrecht von Kursell)
- 1786–1789 Johann von Brevern (1749–1803) (et:Johann von Brevern)
- 1789–1792 Hermann Ludwig von Löwenstern (1749–1815) (de:Hermann Ludwig von Löwenstern (Politiker))
- 1792–1795 Jakob Johann von Patkul (1757–1811) (de:Johann Jakob von Patkul)
- 1795–1796 Alexander Philipp von Saltza (1757–1821) (et:Alexander Philipp von Saltza)

== Provincial Marshals of Nobility of Livonia (1783–1797) ==
- 1783–1786 Leonhard Johann von Budberg-Bönninghausen (1727–1796)
- 1786–1792 Moritz Friedrich von Gersdorff (1747–1820)
- 1792–1797 Friedrich Wilhelm von Sivers (1748–1823)
- 1797 Otto Johann Magnus von Richter (1755–1826)

== See also ==
- Estonian Knighthood
- Livonian Knighthood
