= Marshal of Nobility =

In several countries, the Marshal of Nobility was an elected representative of the nobility to perform certain functions. The term may refer to:

- Marshal of Nobility (Russia) (Предводитель дворянства)
- Marshal of Nobility (Poland) (Marszałek szlachty)
- Marshal of Nobility (Estonia) (Aadlimarssal)
