= Muskhelishvili =

Muskhelishvili (Georgian: მუსხელიშვილი) is a surname. Notable people with the surname include:

- Mikheil Muskhelishvili, Georgian-French political scientist
- Nikoloz Muskhelishvili, Georgian mathematician
- Rostom Muskhelishvili, Georgian military officer
