= Parafiivka settlement hromada =

Coordinates: 50°52′N 32°42′E

Parafiivka settlement hromada Парафіївська селищна громада
- Hromada
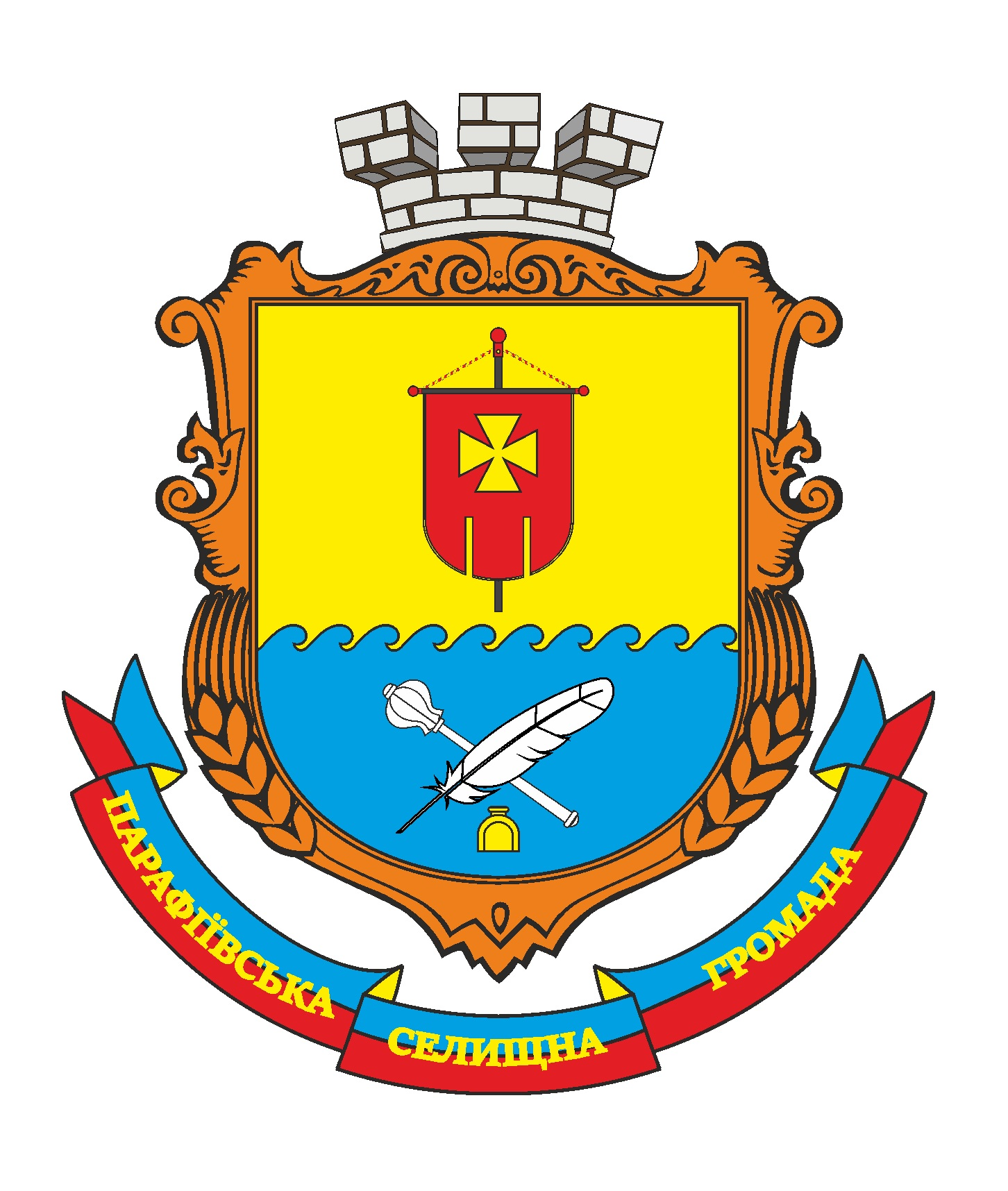
- Coat of arms
- Interactive map of Parafiivka settlement hromada
- Country: Ukraine
- Oblast: Chernihiv
- Raion: Pryluky

Area
  - Total: 369.1 km^{2} (142.5 sq mi)

Population (2020)
  - Total: 6,595
  - Density: 17.87/km^{2} (46.28/sq mi)
- CATOTTG code: UA74080110000023749
- Settlements: 22
- Rural settlements: 5
- Villages: 16
- Towns: 1
- Website: parafiivska-sr.gov.ua

Parafiivka settlement hromada (Ukrainian: Парафіївська селищна громада) is a hromada of Ukraine, located in Pryluky Raion, Chernihiv Oblast. The Parafiivka territorial hromada is located in the north of Pryluky raion, within the Dnieper Lowland. Its administrative center is the town of Parafiivka.

It has an area of 369.1 square kilometres (142.5 mi^{2}) and a population of 6,595, as of 2020.

== Composition ==
The hromada includes 22 settlements: 16 villages:

- Barvinkove
- Berezhivka
- Boyarshchyna
- Vereskuny
- Vlasivka
- Zahin
- Zotsivka
- Ivanytsia
- Kovtunivka
- Kupina
- Lysohory
- Martynivka
- Petrushivka
- Prolisky
- Khaikha
- Yuzhne

And 6 rural-type settlements: Parafiivka, Kachanivka, Luhove, Sofiivka, Trostianets, and Shevchenko.

== Geography ==
The Parafiivka territorial hromada is located in the north of Pryluky raion. The distance from the hromada center to Chernihiv is about 150 km, to Ichnya - 20 km, to Pryluky - 55 km. The territory of the settlement hromadais located within the Dnieper Lowland. The relief of the hromadas surface is a lowland plain, in places dissected by river valleys. The height above sea level is 164 m. The Smozh River, the left tributary of the Udai (Sula basin), flows through the Parafiivka hromada, and a cascade of ponds has been created in the river valley.

The climate of Parafiivka settlement hromada is moderately continental, with warm summers and relatively mild winters. The average temperature in January is about -7°C, and in July - +19°C. The average annual precipitation ranges from 550 to 660 mm, with the highest amount of precipitation in the summer period.

The soil cover of the hromada is dominated by chernozem and podzolized soils. The Parafiivka settlement hromada is located the forest steppe, on the Polesia. The main species in the forests are pine, oak, alder, ash, and birch. Minerals: sand, clay.

The community has a dendrological park of national importance "Trostianets".

== Economy ==
The leading sectors of the hromadas economy are agriculture and food industry.

=== Transportation ===
Regional highways pass through the community. The nearest railway station is Ichnya on the Bakhmach-Pryluky line of the Poltava Directorate of Railway Transportation, located 23 km from Parafiivka.

== See also ==
- List of hromadas of Ukraine
