= Ichnia urban hromada =

Ichnia urban hromada Ічнянська міська громада
- Hromada
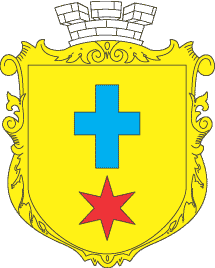
- Coat of arms
- Interactive map of Ichnia urban hromada
- Country: Ukraine
- Oblast: Chernihiv
- Raion: Pryluky

Area
  - Total: 1,205.9 km^{2} (465.6 sq mi)

Population (2020)
  - Total: 22,558
  - Density: 18.706/km^{2} (48.449/sq mi)
- CATOTTG code: UA74080030000040714
- Settlements: 54
- Cities: 1
- Rural settlements: 2
- Villages: 50
- Towns: 1
- Website: ichnya.cg.gov.ua

Ichnia urban hromada (Ukrainian: Ічнянська міська громада) is a hromada of Ukraine, located in Pryluky Raion, Chernihiv Oblast. The Ichnia urban hromada is located within the Dnieper Lowland, in the natural zone of the forest steppe, in Polissya. The largest river is the Udai, a tributary of the Sula. Its administrative center is the city Ichnia.

It has an area of 1,205.9 square kilometres (465.6 mi^{2}) and a population of 22,558, as of 2020.

== Composition ==
The hromada contains 54 settlements: 1 city (Ichnia), 1 town (Druzhba), 50 villages:

- Augustivka
- Andriivka
- Bakaivka
- Barburske
- Bezborodkiv
- Bezvodivka
- Bilmachivka
- Budi
- Burimka
- Vepryk
- Vyshnyvka
- Voronivka
- Heitsi
- Hmyryanka
- Horodnya
- Hrabiv
- Huzhivka
- Dzyubivka
- Dovbni
- Dorohynka
- Zaudaika
- Zinchenkove
- Ivangorod
- Irzhavets
- Itsenkiv
- Kykoly
- Komarivka
- Korshaky
- Krupychpole
- Luchkivka
- Maksimivka
- Monastyryshche
- Nova Olshana
- Novy Podil
- Odolkiv
- Olshana
- Pelyukhivka
- Pryputni
- Rozhnivka
- Svarychivka
- Sezky
- Selikhiv
- Stupakivka
- Tarasivka
- Tyshkivka
- Tomashivka
- Khayenki
- Chervone
- Shilovychi
- Shchurivka

And 2 rural-type settlements: Kolomiitseve and Kulikivka.

== Geography ==
The Ichnia urban hromada is located in the northwest of Pryluky Raion. The hromada is located within the Dnieper Lowland. The relief of the district's surface is a lowland plain, in places dissected by river valleys. All rivers belong to the Dnieper basin. The largest river is the Udai, a tributary of the Sula.

The climate of Ichnia urban hromada is moderately continental, with warm summers and relatively mild winters. The average temperature in January is about -7°C, and in July - +19°C. The average annual precipitation ranges from 550 to 660 mm, with the highest amount of precipitation in the summer period.

The soil cover of the Ichnia urban hromada is dominated by chernozem and podzolized soils. The urban hromada is located in the natural zone of the forest steppe, in Polissya. The main species in the forests are pine, oak, alder, ash, and birch. Minerals: oil, peat, bischofite, gas, sand, clay. The Ichnyansky National Nature Park is located on the territory of the district.

== Economy ==
The leading sectors of the district's economy are agriculture, mining, food industry, and forestry. Agriculture specializes in growing grain and industrial crops, cattle breeding, pig breeding and poultry farming. Oil and gas production is carried out in the hromada. The Monastyryshchensk oil field is being developed on the territory of the hromada.

=== Transportation ===
The Chernihiv-Hrebinka, Pryluky- Bakhmach railways, regional highways and the M01 Derkhav highway pass through the Pryluky Raion. The main railway station is located in Pryluky.

== See also ==
- List of hromadas of Ukraine
