= Ichnia Raion =

Former subdivision of Chernihiv Oblast, Ukraine

Ichnia Raion Ічнянський район
- Raion
- Flag Coat of arms

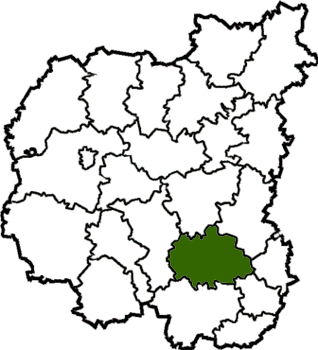
- Raion location in Chernihiv Oblast
- Coordinates: 50°52′28″N 32°26′23″E
- Country: Ukraine
- Oblast: Chernihiv Oblast
- Disestablished: 18 July 2020
- Admin. center: Ichnia

Area
  - Total: 1,576 km^{2} (608 sq mi)

Population (2020)
  - Total: 29,658
  - Density: 18.82/km^{2} (48.74/sq mi)
- Time zone: UTC+2 (EET)
  - Summer (DST): UTC+3 (EEST)
- Website: http://ichadm.cg.gov.ua/

Ichnia Raion (Ukrainian: Ічнянський район) was a raion (district) of Chernihiv Oblast, northern Ukraine. Its administrative centre was located at the city of Ichnia. The raion was abolished on 18 July 2020 as part of the administrative reform of Ukraine, which reduced the number of raions of Chernihiv Oblast to five. The area of Ichnia Raion was merged into Pryluky Raion. The last estimate of the raion population was 29,658 (2020 est.)

At the time of disestablishment, the raion consisted of two hromadas:

- Ichnia urban hromada with the administration in Ichnia;
- Parafiivka settlement hromada with the administration in the urban-type settlement of Parafiivka.
