= Bakhmach =

Urban locality in Chernihiv Oblast, Ukraine

Bakhmach Бахмач
- City
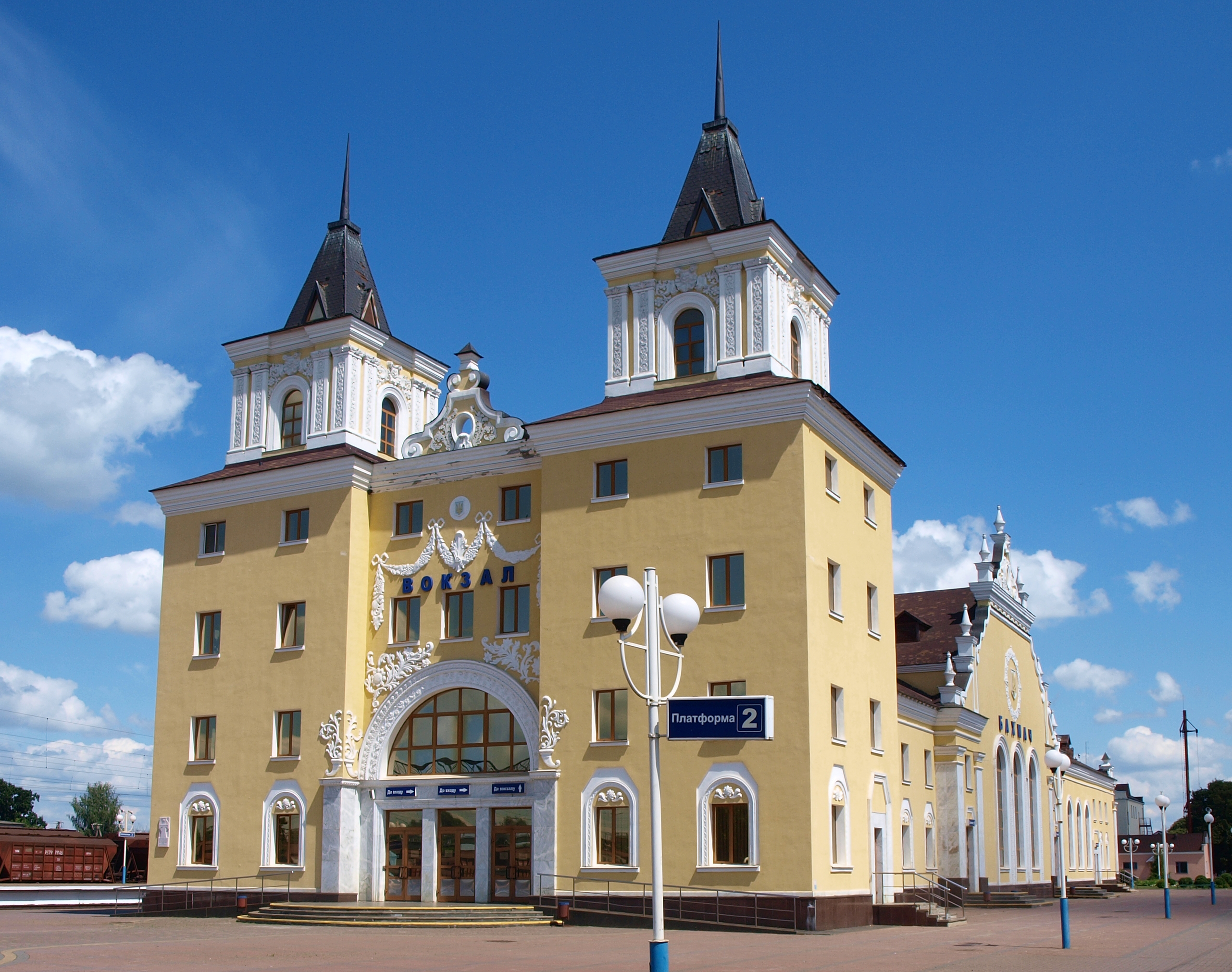
- Station building of Bakhmach-Pasazhyrskyi railway station

- Flag Coat of arms

- Location of Bakhmach in Chernihiv Oblast Bakhmach (Ukraine)
- Coordinates: 51°10′59″N 32°49′47″E
- Country: Ukraine
- Oblast: Chernihiv Oblast
- Raion: Nizhyn Raion
- Hromada: Bakhmach urban hromada
- Established: 1147

Area
  - Total: 18 km^{2} (6.9 sq mi)

Population (2022)
  - Total: 16,862

Bakhmach (Ukrainian: Бахмач, pronounced [ˈbɑxmɐtʃ]) is a city located in Nizhyn Raion of Chernihiv Oblast (province), in northern Ukraine. It hosts the administration of Bakhmach urban hromada, one of the hromadas of Ukraine. It has a population of 16,862 (2022 estimate). In 2025 the population is 16,300 people.

== History ==
=== Name origins ===
An ethnographer explains the name of the city:

"The word Bahmach belongs to the ancient Turkish words that were used in Ukraine before the invasion. "Bahmach" in Turkish means "plantations." it indicates that there was, perhaps at the end of the first millennium BC in Kyiv and Chernihiv, areas of Turkish people from the Turk hordes, which whom called the land their settlement."

However, the most authoritative historian of the city, Vladimir Stepanovich Yevfymovskyy, indicates that the settlement is based on the Bakhmach River, and thus originated in an agricultural tradition.

=== Medieval and Early Modern eras ===
The old city defense is one of the oldest settlements in the East. First mentioned in 1147 in "The Tale of Bygone Years" from the Hypatian Codex, and belonged to the Chernigov principality, but soon was destroyed along with the cities Vyvolozh, White Tower, Unizh (now the village Syvolozh, Białowieża and the city of Nizhyn) during the feudal strife between the princes Olegovichy Chernihiv and Mstislavovich Kyiv.

In the first half of the 17th century on the site of the ancient city of Bakhmach was reborn with the same name (in this period, many cities were rebuilt such as Nizhyn, Konotop, Baturyn, Borzna, Ichnia).

In 1648, during the war under the direction of Bohdan Khmelnytsky, residents of Bakhmach were formed as part of a Chernihiv Sotnia Regiment; thus, making the town a "Sotnia town."

Some of the known Sotnia Captains from Bakhmach:

- Bilotserkivets Panko Omelyanovych (? -1649-?)
- Pavlo S. Tishchenko (? -1654.01.-?)
- Hrodetskyy Ivan S. (? -1661-?)
- Pavlo S. Tishchenko (? -1662.10.-1666-?)
- Hrodetskyy Ivan S. (? -1669.02.-?)
- Paschenko Yakiv (? -1672-?)
- Bilotserkivets Mykhailo Omelyanovych (? -1676-?)
- Biliak Fedir L. (? -1682.07.-?)
- (Dan the Terrible, before 1689),
- R. Stepan (1695-1700)
- Sawicki Samiylo (1700-?)

At the end of the 17th century, near Bakhmach, Mazepa sponsored the construction of a palace residence dedicated for personal use by the hetman. Mazepa was staying in the palace in October 1708, when he sent a message to Charles XII of Sweden, pledging his allegiance to the king. Bakhmach and the neighboring sotnia of Holinka were a sort of guard for Hetman Ivan Mazepa, being particularly committed to their captains, and supported his union with Sweden against Moscow's destroyers and usurpers.

=== Under the Russian Empire ===
Since 1781, Bakhmach was a township of Konotop raion within the Chernihiv Oblast. Bakhmach was known as a "chumak" city which traded Crimean salt and Cherkasy fish on the market.

In 1866, the town was part of Konotop district within the Chernigov Governorate and had a population of 5270 (2399 male; 2550 female). There were: 601 farm yards, two Orthodox churches, a rural court, bazaars, and fairs.

Bakhmach's rapid development began after the completion of the 1869 Kursk-Kyiv and Libau-Romny (1873) railways. The construction of a railway station and tracks marked the beginning of the modern city.

In 1885, the population of Bakhmach was 4741. There were: 888 farm yards, three Orthodox churches, 2 schools, one post office, an inn, 10 stood houses, a shop, a windmill, some markets and annual fairs.

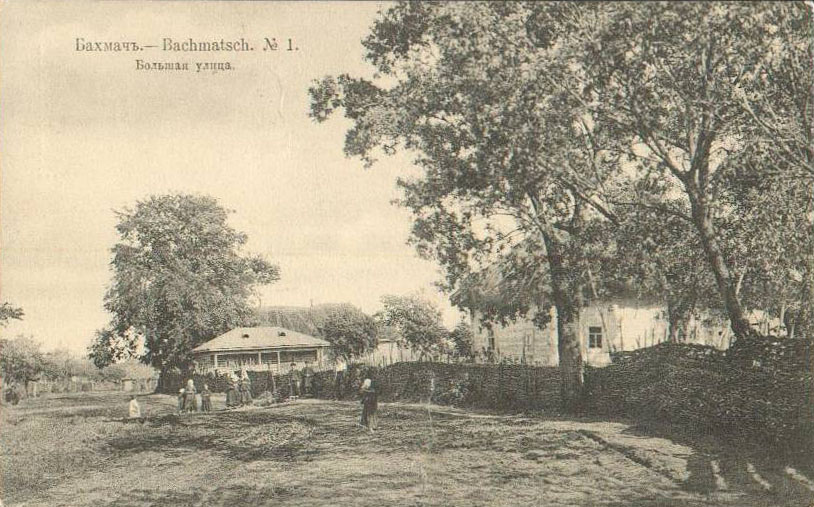
Bakhmach during the early 20th century

In 1892, the Zemstvo school for children of railway workers was opened in Bakhmach. A steam mill began operation in 1894, and a distillery in 1894.

By the 1897 census, the number of inhabitants rose to 6844 people (3355 male; 3489 female), 6623 of which were Orthodox.

In 1903 and 1905, strikes among railroad workers occurred.

=== After 1917 ===
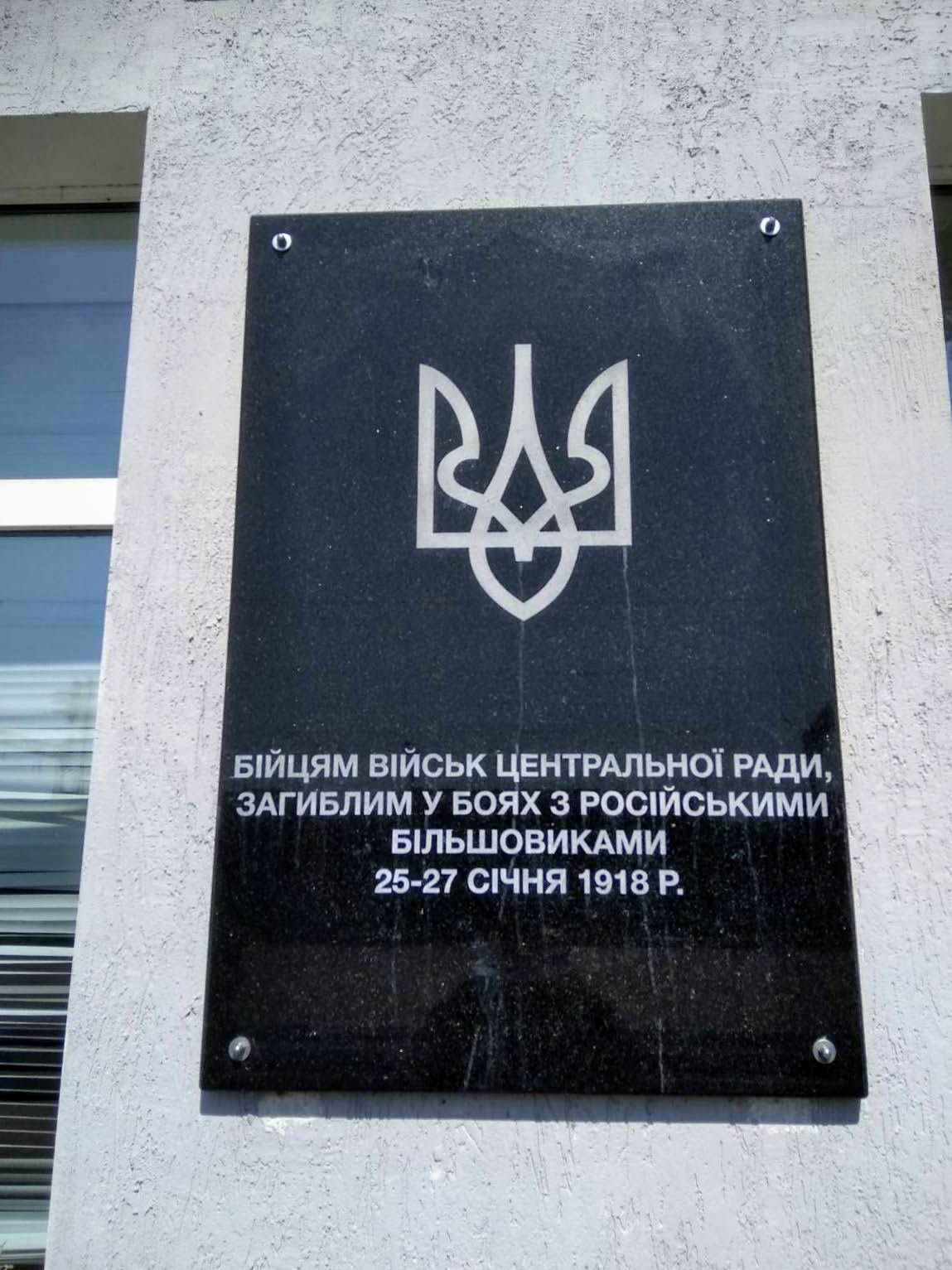
Memorial plaque to Central Rada supporters who fought against the Bolsheviks in Bakhmach

On November 10, 1917 here was a failed attempt to declare Communist power in Bakhmach. The military command of the Central Rada was quickly reestablished and Ukrainian authorities took control of the important railway point. Headquarters units of the Bakhmach Blue division of the UNR were located in a local school.

On January 15, 1918 troops of Moscow and Petrograd Bolsheviks along with the Red Cossacks regiment stormed Bakhmach, capturing the city council and the railway junction.

From 8 to 13 March 1918, the Battle of Bakhmach was fought between the Czech Legion and German forces occupying Ukraine. Following the Legion's victory, the Germans negotiated a truce.

In January 1919, the city was the site of battles between the invading Bolsheviks forces and the Chornomorska Division, which was attempting to keep the Left-bank Ukraine under the control of the army of the Ukrainian National Republic (UNR).

=== Interwar period ===
==== Holodomor ====
Bakhmach and the entire Bakhmach district were included by the communist authorities in the so-called "Black Board". This led to the mass death of children and the elderly, as well as provoked the adult population of Bakhmach to openly resist the occupation authorities. Punitive special units of the NKVD took advantage of this and carried out shootings of locals. The majority of Bakhmach residents became victims of the Holodomor. In the city, near the newly built church of St. George the Victorious (Ukrainian Orthodox Church), a memorial to the memory of fellow countrymen who were victims of the famine of 1932–1933 has been installed.

==== Development during the 1930s ====
In 1932 Bakhmach's population reached 4,000 inhabitants. In addition to industrial construction, the city's social and cultural sphere was developing. The network of medical institutions was expanding. A new building was constructed for the district hospital with 25 beds, a polyclinic and a railway hospital were opened in the area of the Bakhmach-Kyivs'kyi station. Medical points were opened in the local telephone station and beet farm. The medical assistance to the city residents was provided by 10 doctors and 50 medium-level medical personnel. A kindergarten and a nursery were built. Education and culture were developing. In 1932, both seven-year schools were transformed into secondary schools, one primary school was turned into a seven-year school, and the other was closed. However, the schools operated irregularly during this time, as most children were suffering from the famine organized by the Soviet authorities.

At the end of 1934, illiteracy among adults was eradicated. In 1936, all schools in Bakhmach became vocational schools, and technical education was introduced. That same year, an evening high school was opened based on the evening work factory, which was established in 1930. The residents of the district spent their leisure time in 4 clubs: 2 railway clubs – named after May 1 and Taras Shevchenko, one at the Petrovsky factory, and one at the beet farm. At the same time, Orthodox churches were closed and destroyed, and people's religious beliefs were mercilessly ridiculed, while the clergy were persecuted.

In 1934, the district library began to operate, and on the eve of the war, there were 7 libraries in Bakhmach with a book fund of about 40,000 copies - most in Russian and promoting class and national hatred. The district newspaper "Prapor Komuni" of the political department of the Bakhmatska MTS "Bilshovytskyi Shliakh", and the newspaper of the beet farm "Za Sotsialistychnyi Vrozhai" were published in the city. All of them served the authorities during the genocide of the Ukrainian people in 1932–1933, carefully concealing the facts of the mass deaths of people from malnutrition. As of 1939, the population of Bakhmach was 10,340 people, with a significant portion being refugees from villages destroyed by the Holodomor. They worked in low-paying and unskilled jobs, which was beneficial to the communist regime.

In 1938, Bakhmach was designated as a city.

=== World War II ===
World War II immediately impacted the life of the city. The city council established round-the-clock duty. A commission was formed to provide assistance to evacuees, who were being taken east by trains. Trains carrying refugees, wounded soldiers of the Red Army, military equipment, and factory equipment intended for evacuation passed through the Bakhmach railway. There were quite a few of these trains at the Bahmach-Homelsky and Bahmach-Pasazhyrsky stations. Trains could not escape the hub because some of the tracks on bypass routes were damaged by devastating German air raids.

On July 14, 1941, there were no free tracks at the Bahmach-Kyivsky station. In the morning, trains with military personnel and fuel were gathered there. Trains with evacuees, refugees, and factory equipment waited to be sent to the rear. At two o'clock, German aviation bombed this cluster of trains, turning the Bahmach-Kyivsky station into ruins. Fuel tanks on the rails did not burn but fell off their wheel pairs. The ground around burned, and in some places, railroad ties were burned down completely. During this memorable bombing for Bakhmach, surrounding streets were also affected. On the Communist Petrovsky Street (now Dankivskyi Shliakh), which ran parallel to the Bahmach-Kyivsky station, not a single house survived, and all buildings were burned down completely. The Post Street, on the other side of the station, was also affected. The post office, the market square, and adjacent private and state-owned estates were destroyed.

During the air raid, other city buildings were also destroyed: the city council, power station, canteen, and some residential buildings.

On August 21, 1941, the German aviation bombed the city again. This time, they bombed the Bahmach-Passenger station and nearby suburbs.

During this air raid, both state and private properties were damaged. However, the losses were much less than from the bombing on July 14. A bomb directly hit the newly built two-story railway post building, three large state buildings across from the Bahmach-Passenger station burned down. The bomb also hit the military townlet's car park, where it disabled four military vehicles and killed two soldiers from the battalion. Residents were injured and killed as well.

From that day on, Bakhmach was bombed almost every day. The residents moved from the city to the nearest villages and hamlets. The city became a ghost town, like during the communist Holodomor. The building of the Bachmach-Passenger railway station, the residential complex of cooperative buildings in Goidenkovy Garden (except for one miraculously preserved building), the bath and laundry plant, the Soviet military townlet, the burnt textile factory and seed plant, the Zagotzerno warehouses, and the poultry farm were burned down or damaged. Due to the desire of the Red Army command to stop the Germans at any cost, Bachmach suffered enormous destruction. The German administration worked in the city for over two years – 1941–1943. On September 9, 1943, the troops of the 75th Guards Rifle Division liberated the city from German occupation. After the return of the Red Army, the NKVD of the USSR authorities began a terror campaign against the local population. Forced mobilization also began.

=== Postwar era ===
After the end of the war Bakhmach continued to serve as an important railway hub connecting Kyiv and Moscow, and developed as a centre of food industry.

Until 18 July 2020, Bakhmach served as an administrative center of Bakhmach Raion. The raion was abolished in July 2020 as part of the administrative reform of Ukraine, which reduced the number of raions of Chernihiv Oblast to five. The area of Bakhmach Raion was merged into Nizhyn Raion.

=== Russian invasion of Ukraine ===
During the Russian invasion of Ukraine on February 26, 2022, at least 65 units of Russian military equipment moved through Bakhmach, with about a hundred more on the outskirts. Local residents tried to stop the convoy on their own by blocking tank tracks with makeshift objects and convincing Russian soldiers not to move towards Kyiv. One man attempted to climb onto a tank and block the road with his body (he was not hurt). However, the military equipment continued to move, and Russian forces fired several shots into the air.

== Demographics ==
=== Population ===
Historical population

Year	Pop.	±%
1959	13,066	—
1970	16,270	+24.5%
1989	22,824	+40.3%

Year	Pop.	±%
2001	20,332	−10.9%
2016	18,411	−9.4%

=== Ethnic groups ===
Distribution of the city's population by ethnicity as per the 2001 Ukrainian census:

Ethnic groups in Bakhmach
	percent
Ukrainians	94.45%
Russians	4.53%
Belarusians	0.33%
Gypsies	0.20%
Jews	0.07%
Moldovans	0.06%
others	0.36%

=== Distribution of Native Language (2001) ===
Ukrainian	Russian
95.03%	4.51%

== Transport ==
Today, Bachmach is an important railway junction for five directions: Moscow, Kharkiv, Dnipro, Kyiv, and Minsk.

The city has three railway stations:

1. Bakhmach-Pasazhyrsky
2. Bakhmach-Kyivskyi
3. Bakhmach-Homelskyi.

== Culture ==
=== Media ===
- Bakhmach regional independent newspaper "Advisor" «Порадник»
- The district newspaper "Voice Pryseymiv'ya" «Голос Присеймів'я»

=== Education and society ===
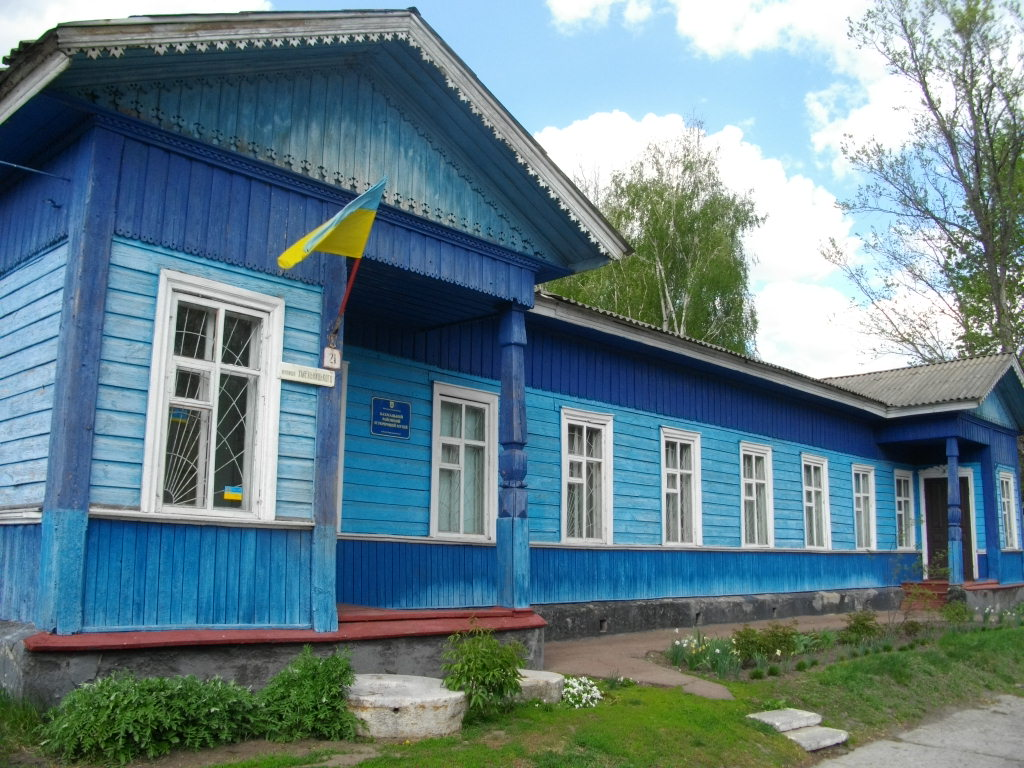
Historical Museum

Social, cultural, and educational institutions in the city include three full-time and one evening secondary schools, a gymnasium, a school of arts, a local history museum, eight libraries, a central district hospital, three clinics, a district House of Culture, a railway workers' club, and a Student House. There is also a well-known park with a children's railway for recreation.

== Sports ==
The city has a football team called "Agrodim" which plays matches at the "Kolos" stadium. The team won the Championship of the Chernihiv region in 2017.

== Gallery ==
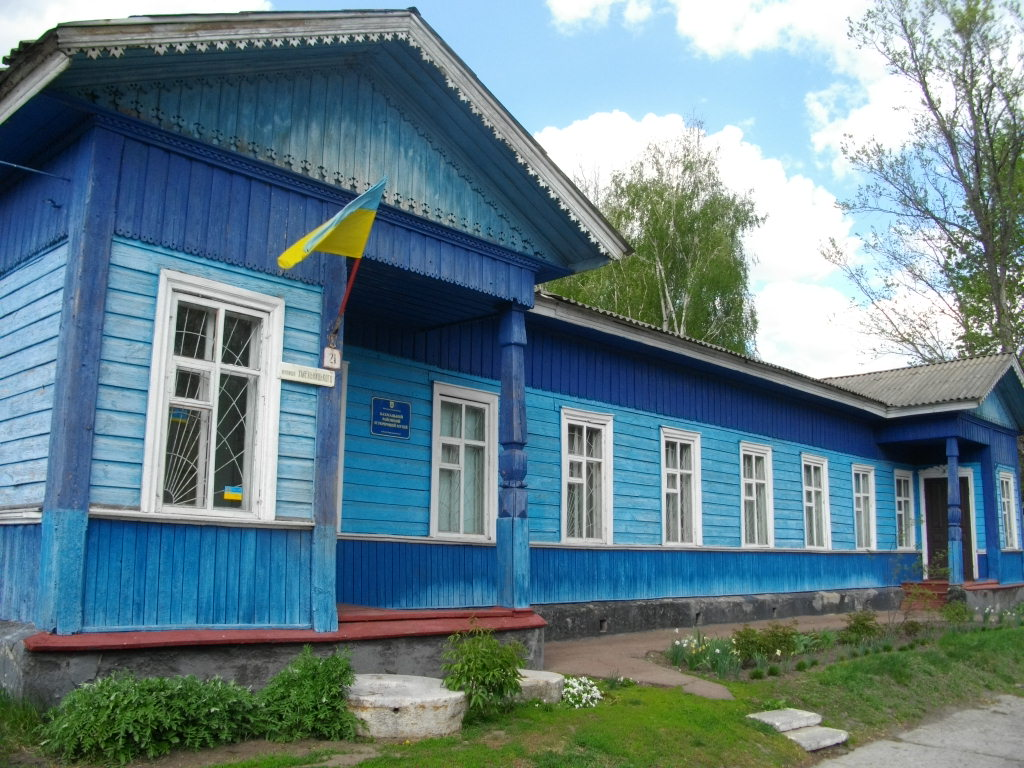
Historical Museum in Bakhmach

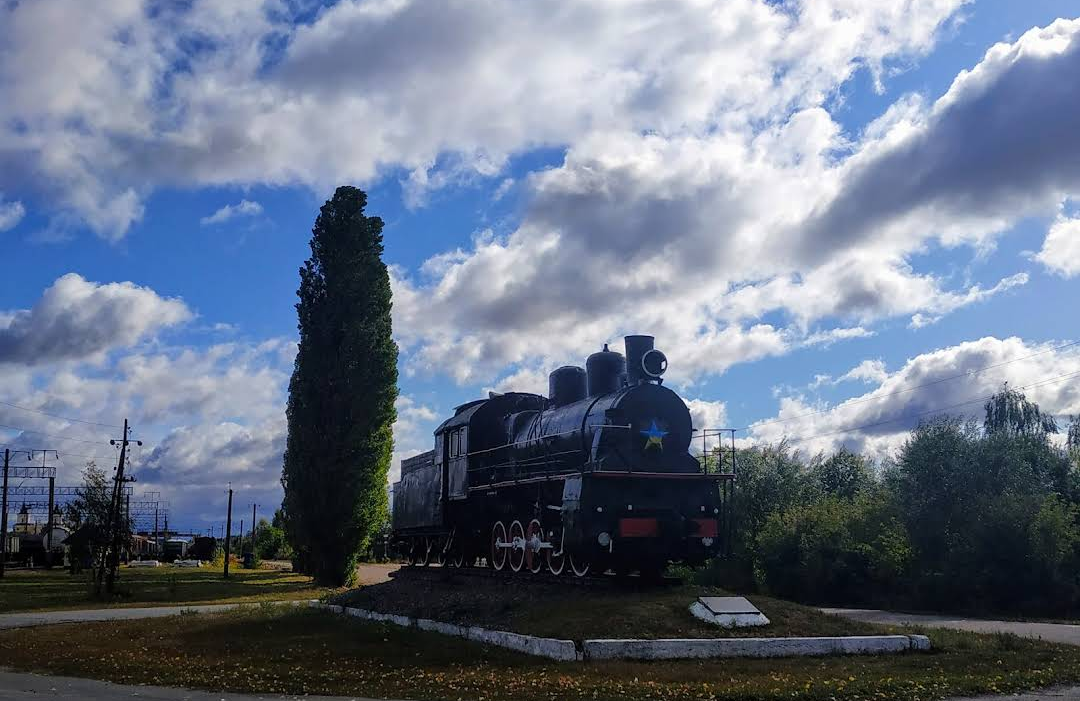
locomotive of the Em series in Bakhmachi

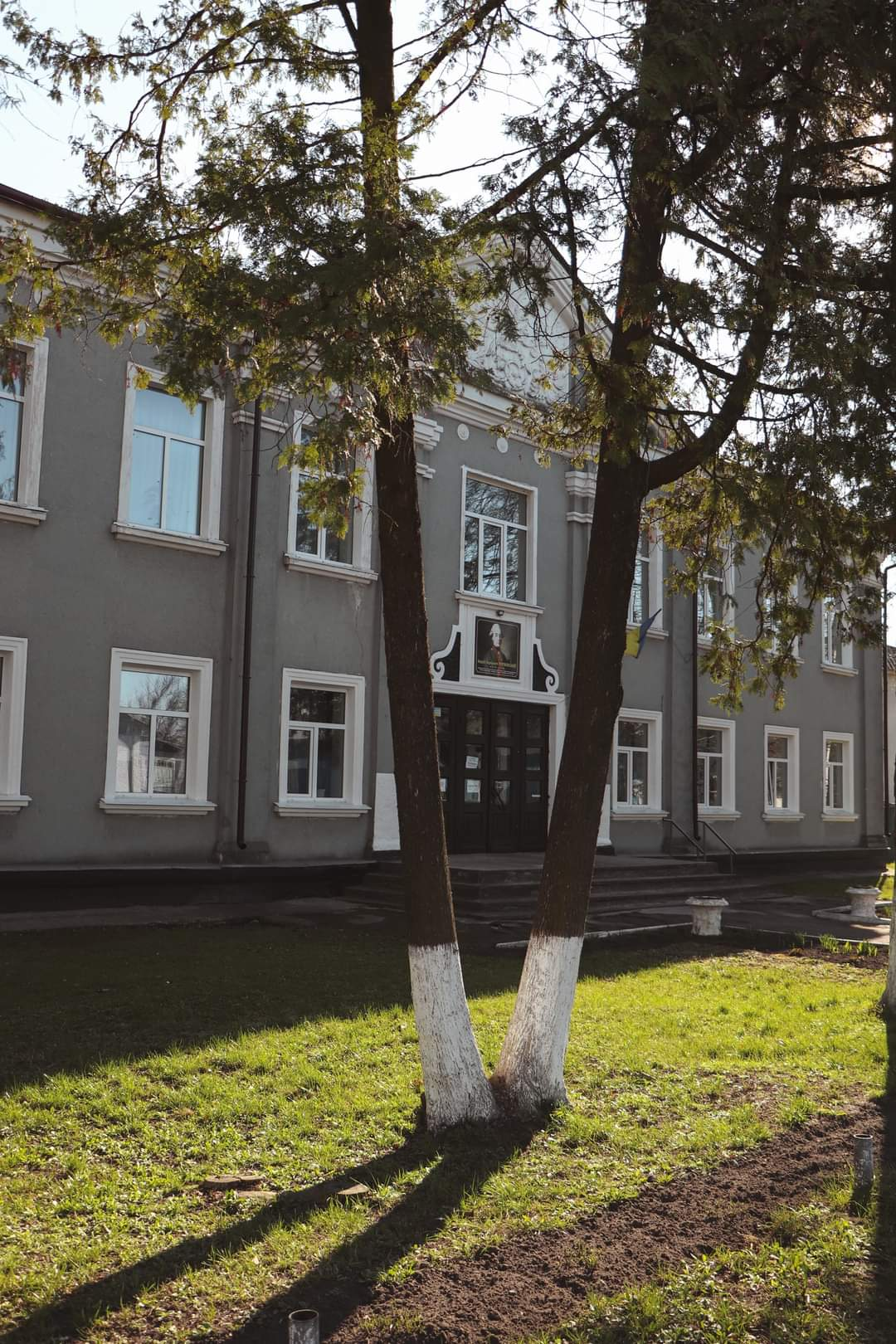
School of Music

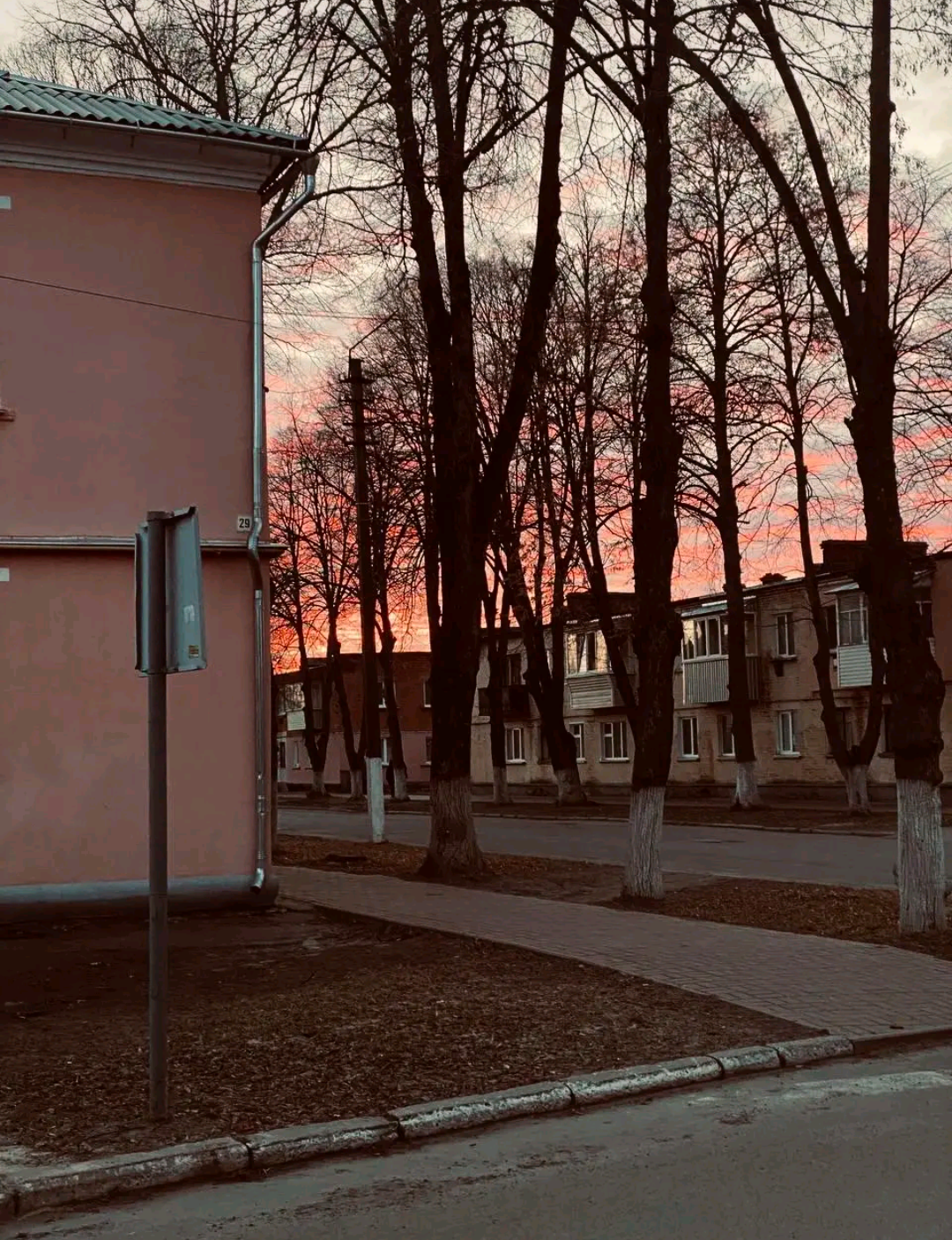
Bakhmach streets
