= Ichnia =

Urban locality in Chernihiv Oblast, Ukraine

Ichnia Ічня
- City
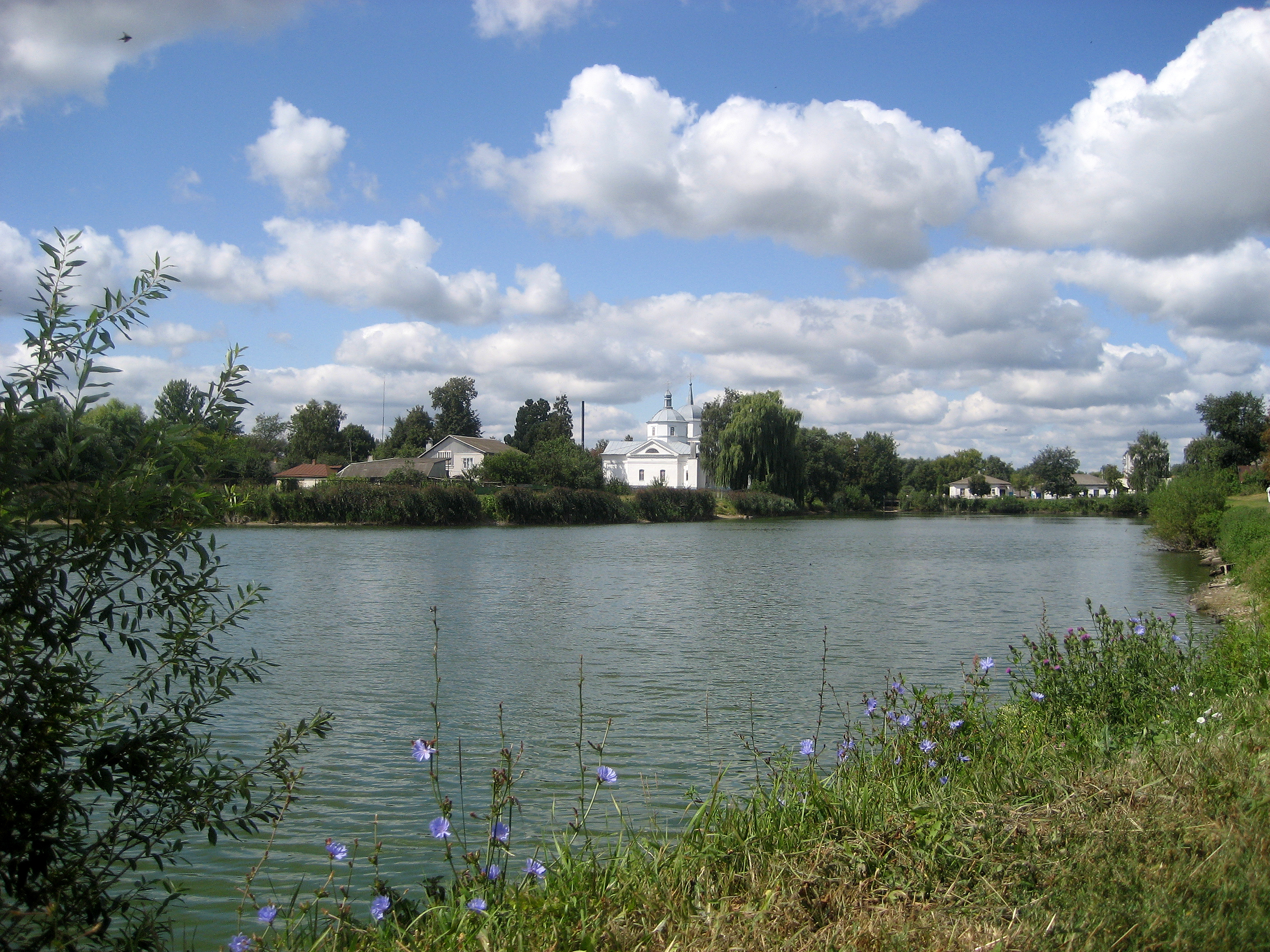
- Church of Transfiguration on the river Ichenka

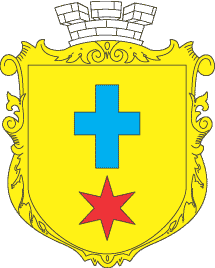
- Flag Coat of arms

- Location of Ichnia Ichnia (Ukraine)
- Coordinates: 50°51′00″N 32°24′00″E
- Country: Ukraine
- Oblast: Chernihiv Oblast
- Raion: Pryluky Raion
- Hromada: Ichnia urban hromada
- Founded: 14th century
- City status on: 1957

Area
  - Total: 16.16 km^{2} (6.24 sq mi)

Population (2022)
  - Total: ▼10,390
- Time zone: UTC+2 (EET)
  - Summer (DST): UTC+3 (EEST)
- Postal code: 16700-16703
- Area code: +380-4633
- Website: https://ichnya.cg.gov.ua/

Ichnia (Ukrainian: Ічня, pronounced [ˈitʃnʲɐ]) is a small city in Pryluky Raion, Chernihiv Oblast, Ukraine, located on the Ichenka River in the Dnieper Lowland. It hosts the administration of Ichnia urban hromada, one of the hromadas of Ukraine. Population is 10,390 (2022 estimate).

== Etymology ==
There is evidence that in ancient times there was a small settlement called Yaskove, which was destroyed by the Mongol-Tatars. The city got its name from the name of the river Ichen, and the name of the river itself was transformed into the affectionate form of Ichenka. Researchers associate the name of the river with Tatar ichen 'watering hole', 'parking for horses'.

== History ==
The first information about Ichnia dates back to the 14th century. From the 14th to 16th centuries, it was ruled by the Grand Duchy of Lithuania and the Polish–Lithuanian Commonwealth.

In the middle of the 16th century, Ichnia was granted with the status of a market town. Under the Cossack Hetmanate it served as a sotnia town of Pryluky Regiment. In 1666, a town hall was built. Probably at this time, the Ichnia's castle was built. Residents of the city participated in the struggle against the Swedish army of Charles XII of Sweden during the Great Northern War.

In 1748, Ichnia's 20 households belonged to Knyaz N. Saakadze, and 119 households - Colonel from Pryluky G. Galagan. The town had a distillery, 6 water mills, and a brickyard.

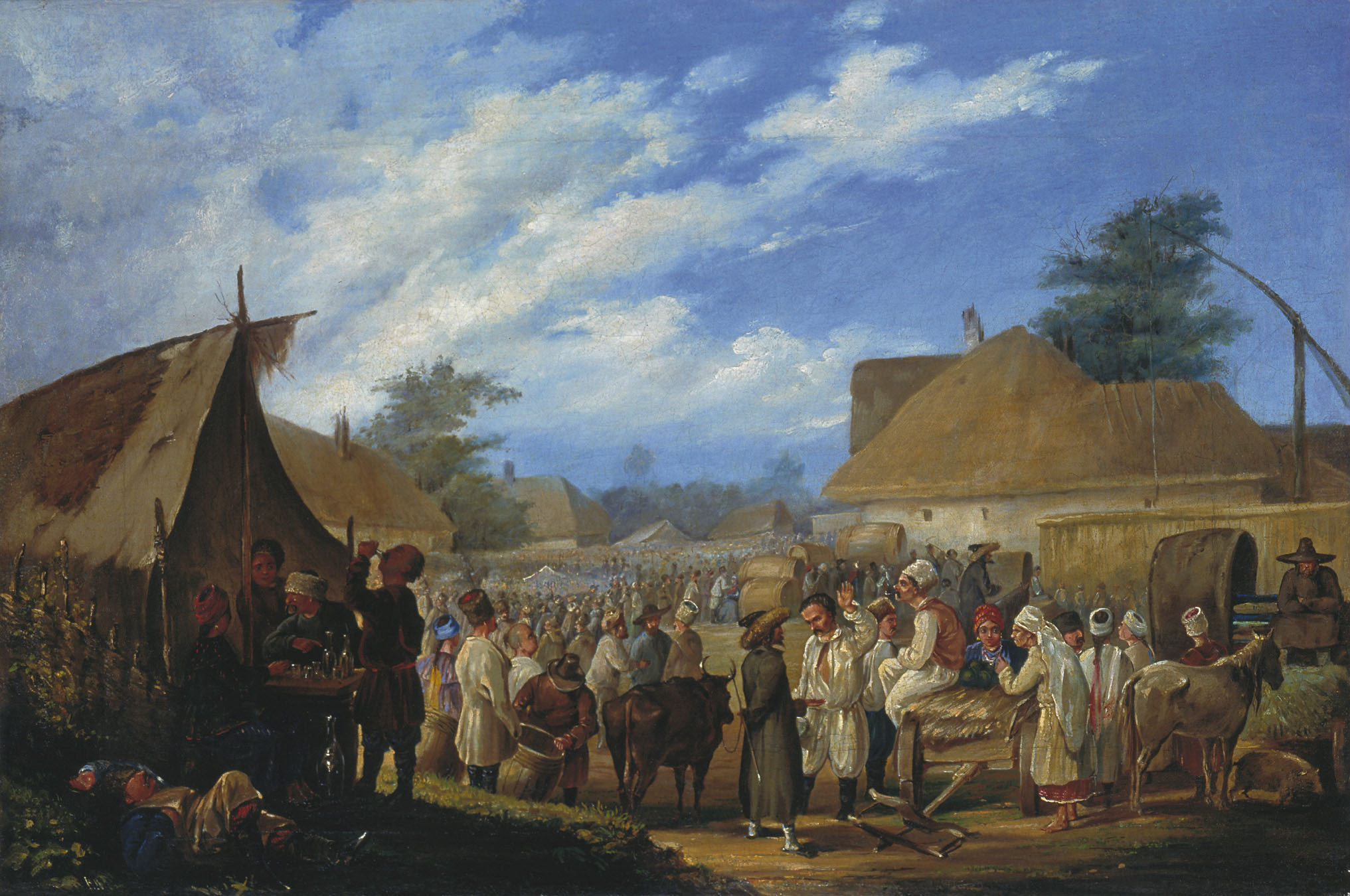
Vasily Sternberg. Fair in Ichnia (1830s)

As of 1788, three annual fairs were held in Ichnia, in which residents traded bread, cattle, victuals, and wooden utensils.

There were four schools in Ichnia in the 18th century.

In 1812, the Cossacks of Ichnia fought in the Chernigov Regiment during French invasion of Russia.

At the beginning of the 19th century, landowner G. Galagan founded a cloth factory in the town, as well as a sugar factory, 2 distilleries, brick factories, and saltpeter factories.

In 1894, the town was included into a local railroad connection. In 1897, there were four stone churches. The town operated a post office, hospital, rural and ministerial school, and library.

In 1926 the population stood at 12,000 inhabitants. Under the Soviet rule Ichnia was designated an urban-type settlement. In 1957, Ichnia received the status of a town.

Nowadays, the leading branch of economy in Ichnia is food industry (alcohol, tobacco, feed mill, canning, and cheese-milk powder).

In October 2018, Ichnya became an epicenter of massive fire following an explosion at the munitions depot of the 6th Arsenal (military unit A-1479). More than 12,500 people were evacuated and a no-fly zone was established. The fire lasted for 23 days. According to the Ukrainian authorities sabotage was the cause of the explosions.

Until 18 July 2020, Ichnia was the administrative center of Ichnia Raion. The raion was abolished in July 2020 as part of the administrative reform of Ukraine, which reduced the number of raions of Chernihiv Oblast to five. The area of Ichnia Raion was merged into Pryluky Raion.

== Demographics ==
The national composition of the population according to the results of 2001 Ukrainian census was as follows: Ukrainians - 96.66%, Russians - 2.94%.

=== Population ===
1859	1910	1926	1939	1959	1979	1989	2001	2020
6084	9663	11,995	14,338	13,131	13,765	13,632	12,780	10,709

=== By language ===
Ukrainian	Russian
97,39 %	2,48 %

== Economy ==
The town has factories: alcohol factory, packaging factory, food factory, canning factory, milk powder and butter factory, dairy factory. A branch of the Pryluky Art Factory is also located in Ichnia.

On October 1, 2016, "Sidko Ukraine" in Ichnia opened the first stage of a plant for processing sunflower and other crops.The capacity of the plant is 80 tons per day when working in two shifts. "Sidko Ukraine" is a joint venture between Ukrainian and Estonian investors. The plant's partners are more than 50 companies from the European Union and Japan and supply regions are constantly expanding.

== Culture ==
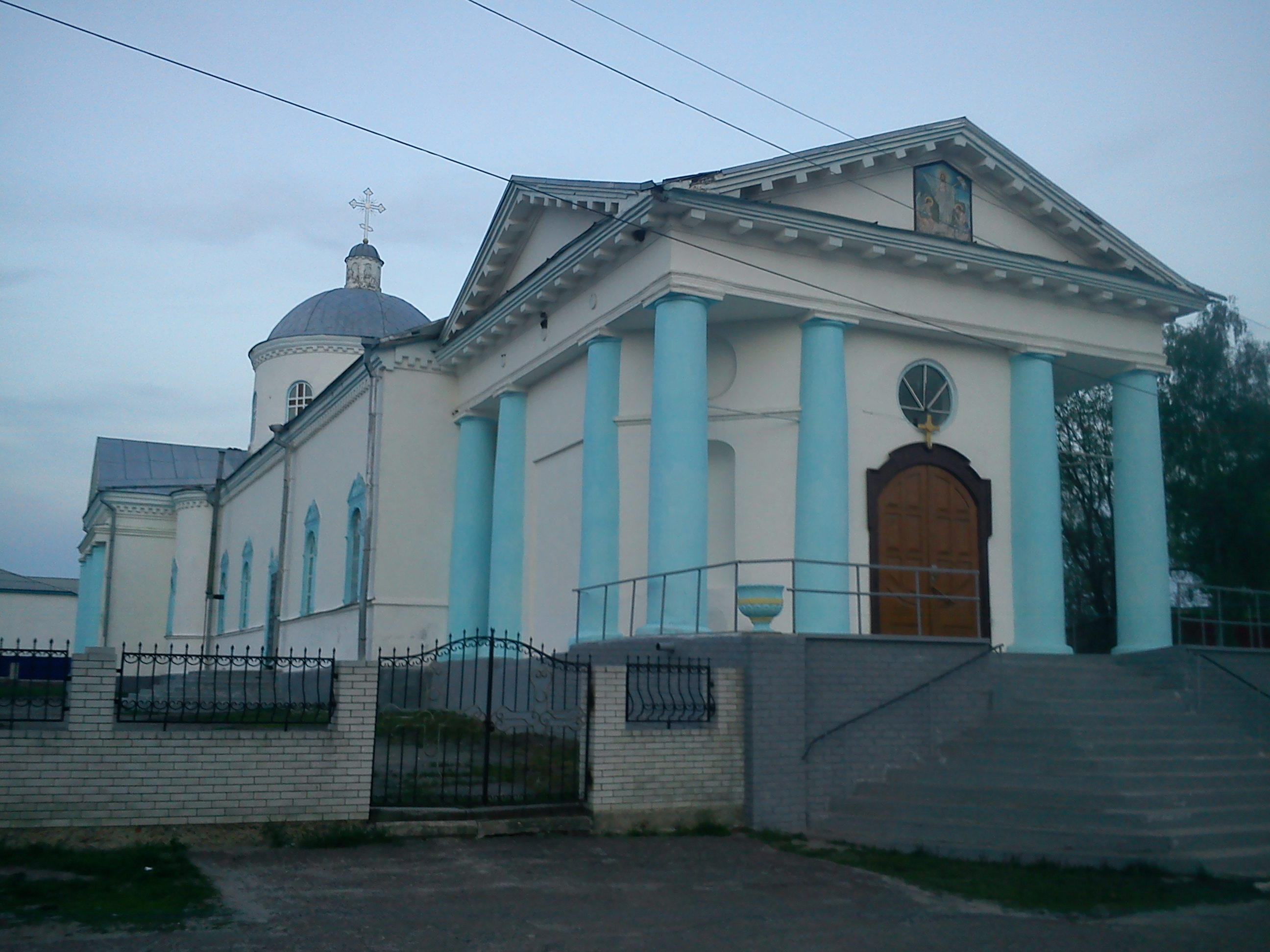
Church of the Resurrection

The town houses the Ichnia Museum of local History, the Museum of the Artist Mykola Ge (he lived on a farm near the modern village of Ivangorod, Ichnia district), a plant protection station. In gymnasium named after S. Vasylchenkoa public museum of Ukrainian studies was founded, which is cared for by Tetyana Chumak. Since the early 1960s there is a school of arts (former music school) located in the center of the city in the premises of the former district committee of the party.

At the initiative of the public (bypassing the then order, when everything required permission "from above"), monuments were erected in the city to famous artists from Ichnia - I. Martos, S. Vasylchenko, V. Chumak, A. Drofan. In 2009, a monument to Taras Shevchenko was erected in the center of Ichnia, who visited the city on trips to Irzhavets and Kachanivka.

The association of writers "Krynytsia" (founder and head Stanislav Marynchyk) has been working in Ichnia for a long time. It consists of more than 50 people, including members of the National Union of Writers of Ukraine. Krynychany published several dozen of their books. The association publishes the almanac "Ichnyanska Krynytsia".

The creative potential of Ichnia residents is also realized in the publication of a free press. From the first years of Ukraine's declaration of independence, the Ichnyanshchyna newspaper (editors Viktor Havrys, later Valentyna Karpenko) was popular and influential in the city and district, and later Nasha Gazeta (editor Vira Salata) and Ichnyanska Panorama began to be published. The literary association has the magazine "Ichnyanska Krynytsia". The city also has its own publishing house "Format", which is managed by Victor Vlasko. The literary almanac "Dzherelna Ichenka" (editor Tetyana Chumak) has also been published for several years, around which artists also gather. The Ichnyanshchyna Historical and Cultural Society (headed by Mykola Tereshchenko) was established.

In honor of famous countrymen, local authorities together with the public established creative awards in name of S. Vasylchenko (fiction), V. Chumak (poetry), V. Ivy (journalism), who are awarded annually for the best works. Public figure Vitaliy Shevchenko founded and takes care of the foundation, which annually holds competitions among gifted children of Ichnia region (the works of the winners are published) and publishes a series of books on the history of Ichnia region. The V. Shevchenko Foundation presents annual awards - "Family. Ichnia. Ukraine”(literary and artistic creativity of schoolchildren), named after O. Storozhenko (works of humor and satire), "The past comes to life" (history of villages, corners, streets).

Architectural monuments: the Church of the Transfiguration, the Church of the Resurrection (in which in 1660 Yakym Somko was proclaimed the Hetman of the Left Bank of Ukraine), the bell tower of St. Nicholas Church, the church itself, which is associated with the name of I. Mazepa and which was painted by V. Borovikovsky, M. Ge, V. Vasnetsov, (during the Soviet era destroyed by the communists), the house of businessman I. Maslov (now the police station), a complex of old houses in the city center.

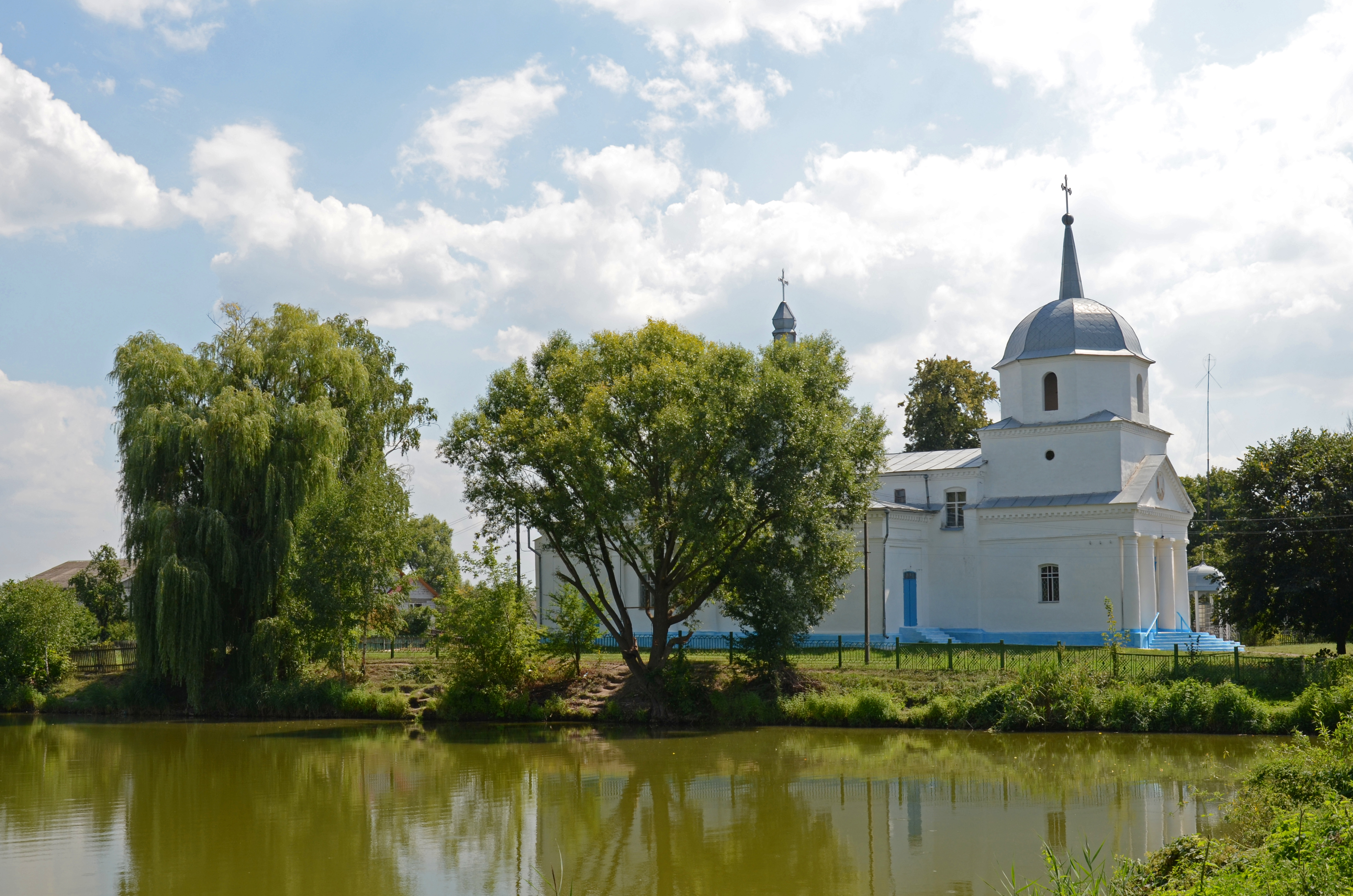
Church of the Transfiguration

== Notable people ==
- Sonia Greene (16 March 1883 - 26 December 1972) - a one-time pulp fiction writer and amateur publisher, a single mother, business woman, and successful milliner, who bankrolled several fanzines in the early 20th century.
- Ivan Martos (1754 — 5 April 1835) - a Russian sculptor and art teacher of Ukrainian origin, who helped awaken Russian interest in Neoclassical sculpture.
- Mykola Kyrychenko (1940—2008) Ukrainian cybernetician, teacher, doctor of physical and mathematical sciences, professor, laureate of the State Prize of Ukraine in the field of science and techniques.
- Serhiy Maslov (1880—1857) - Ukrainian literary critic, bibliologist, literary historian and teacher.
- Serhiy Petrauskas (1977-2021) - senior soldier of the Armed Forces of Ukraine, participant in the Russo-Ukrainian war.
- Anatoliy Drophan (1919—1988) - Ukrainian writer.
- Vasyl Shvydchenko (1911—2000) - Ukrainian painter and sculptor, member of the National Union of Artists of Ukraine.
- Vasyl Chumak (1901—1919) - Ukrainian poet, publicist, revolutionary, public and cultural figure.
- Vitaliy Shevchenko (born 1954) - journalist, writer, politician, public figure.
- Serhiy Titarenko (1889 -?) - publisher and journalist.
- Hryhorii Koval (1921—1997) - Ukrainian poet.
- Stanislav Marynchyk (1937, Ichnia) - Ukrainian writer, director and screenwriter.
- Akhyp Kmeta (1891-1978) - military and public figure, officer of Army of the UPR, one of the founders of the Ukrainian Military Union, the Society of Former Soldiers of the Army of the UPR.
