= Ilya Likhtarev =

Ukrainian biophysicist

- Илья Аро́нович Лихтарёв
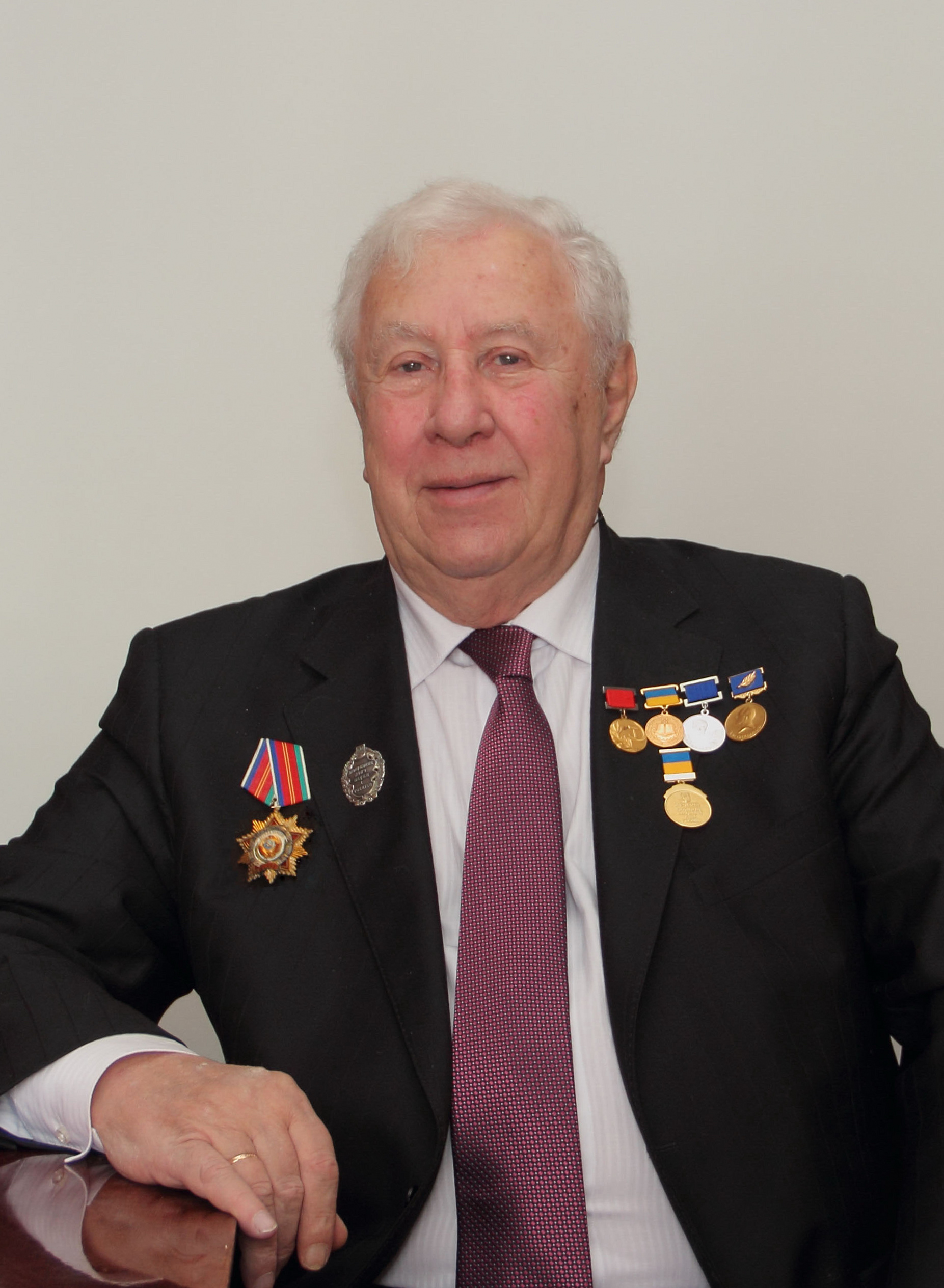
- Ilya Likhtarev (2016)
- Born: February 1, 1935; Pryluky, Ukrainian SSR, USSR (Present day in Pryluky in Ukraine)
- Died: January 14, 2017 (aged 81); Kyiv, Ukraine
- Citizenship: Ukraine
- Education: All-Union Correspondence Polytechnic Institute
- Known for: development of radiation control systems, liquidator of consequences of Chernobyl accident
- Scientific career
- Fields: Biophysics
- Workplaces: Institute of Radiation Hygiene (St. Petersburg); National Research Center for Radiation Medicine of National Academy of Medical Sciences of Ukraine
- Thesis: Kinetics of transport of radionuclides in human body and experimental animals (Russian: Кинетика транспорта радиоизотопов в организме человека и экспериментальных животных (1976)

Ilya Aronovich Likhtarev (1 February 1935 – 14 January 2017) was a Ukrainian biophysicist who specialized in radiation dosimetry and radiological protection. Likhtarev was also the founder of Ukrainian Radiation Protection Institute of the Academy of Technological Sciences of Ukraine, and a member of the ICRP (1992–2006) and National Commission of Radiological Protection of the USSR and Ukraine.

== Biography ==
Likhtarev spent his childhood in Kyiv (with the exception of evacuation during World War II). In 1955, he graduated from technical school in Kyiv (with excellency). In 1962, he graduated from the All-Union Correspondence Polytechnic Institute with an engineer-physicist qualification and returned to Kyiv. He worked in the radiology group of Kyiv Regional Sanitary-Epidemiological Station in 1960–1964.

In 1968, he was awarded the degree of Candidate of Engineering Sciences from St. Petersburg Research Institute of Radiation Hygiene (IRH) with a specialization in radiation safety. The subject of his thesis was radioactive iodine (his scientific supervisors were Leonid Ilyin and Victor Shamov). Likhtarev founded the Laboratory of Radiation Biophysics and became its head at IRH in that year. The laboratory performed research on the metabolism of the radionuclides of iodine, tritium, strontium, calcium, plutonium, and other radionuclides in humans and animals. In 1976, he was awarded the degree of Doctor of Sciences in Physical and Mathematical Sciences with a specialization of "03.00.02" (biophysics), and later became a professor in 1984.

After the Chernobyl disaster, Likhtarev returned to Ukraine in May 1986 since he worked on Chernobyl from Kyiv. In October 1986, he became the head of the Department of Dosimetry and Radiation Hygiene at the Institute of Hygiene and Epidemiology (current title — National Research Center for Radiation Medicine of the National Academy of Medical Sciences of Ukraine). In 1995, he became a director general of the Ukrainian Radiation Protection Institute of the Academy of Technological Sciences of Ukraine, as well as head of the Department of Radiation Safety there.

== Scientific activity ==
The scientific interests of Likhtarev included the simulation of radionuclide transfer processes in natural environments and in the human body, dosimetry of internal and external exposure, radiation protection and safety, application of dose limits, radiation safety applied to accidents at nuclear power plants, and the environmental impact of Chernobyl accident.

In 1968, Likhtarev was awarded a Candidate of Sciences in Engineering.

Likhtarev made contributions to the liquidation of the consequences of the Chernobyl accident, the creation of the National System of Radiological Protection, and the further development of dosimetry, the biokinetics of radionuclides in the human body, and radiation epidemiology.

He proposed the system of retrospective estimation of radiation doses to the thyroid for all population of Ukraine. Later, this system was developed and implemented. He started the development and spread of the national system of general dosimetric passportization of settlements in Ukraine, which were impacted by radioactive contamination after the Chernobyl fallout.

From 1978 to 1991, Likhtarev was a member of the National Commission of Radiological Protection of the USSR, and from 1992 to 2006 he was a member of the International Commission on Radiological Protection.

He was head of the international projects CEC-CIS, COSYMA, and INCO COPERNICUS.

In 1992, Likhtarev became the head of the Commission on Hygienic Standards and Guidelines for Radioactive Substances and Radiation Factor based in Kyiv. From 2000 to 2007, he was the head freelance specialist in radiation hygiene of the Ministry of Health of Ukraine. In 2002, he became the head of the Expert Commission for State Sanitary-Epidemiological Expertise in highly complicated cases as an aid to the Chief Sanitary Medical Officer of Ukraine. In 2002, Ilya Liktarev was elected as a member of the Radiation Safety Standards Committee of the IAEA. In 2009, he was appointed the head of consultative council on radiation protection of the State Nuclear Regulatory Inspectorate of Ukraine.

25 Candidates of Science and 10 Doctors of Science were part of a scientific school headed by Likhtarev.

== Scientific publications ==
Likhtarev published over 600 scientific works, including the publications of the International Commission of Radiological Protection, UNSCEAR, World Health Organization, and the IAEA. His scientific works were published in the journals Health Physics, Radiation Research, Radiation Protection Dosimetry in Germany, Japan, Russia, Belarus, the United States, Austria, Israel, China, Argentina, and Brazil. He edited 15 books, primarily focusing on dosimetry, epidemiology, and the effects of the Chernobyl disaster.

== Awards and honorary titles ==
- State Prize of the USSR in the Field of Science and Engineering (1983) for his participation in the development of the system of radiation control for soviet atomic centers in Chelyabinsk, Krasnoyarsk and Novosibirsk.
- State Prize of Ukraine in Science and Technology (2004).
- Honored Scientist of Ukraine (2011).
- Academician Victor Glushkov medal (2014).
- Diploma of the United Nations "for a distinct personal contribution to implementation of international Chernobyl programs and setting high standards in the name of prosperity of Ukraine" (2016).

== Personal life ==
Ilya Likhtarev was married twice. His first wife Tamara died,and so he was survived by his second wife, Lionella Kovgan. Ilya Likhtarev had two sons, Mikhail and Dmitry.
