= Leonid Shkolnick =

Ukrainian engineer and scientist

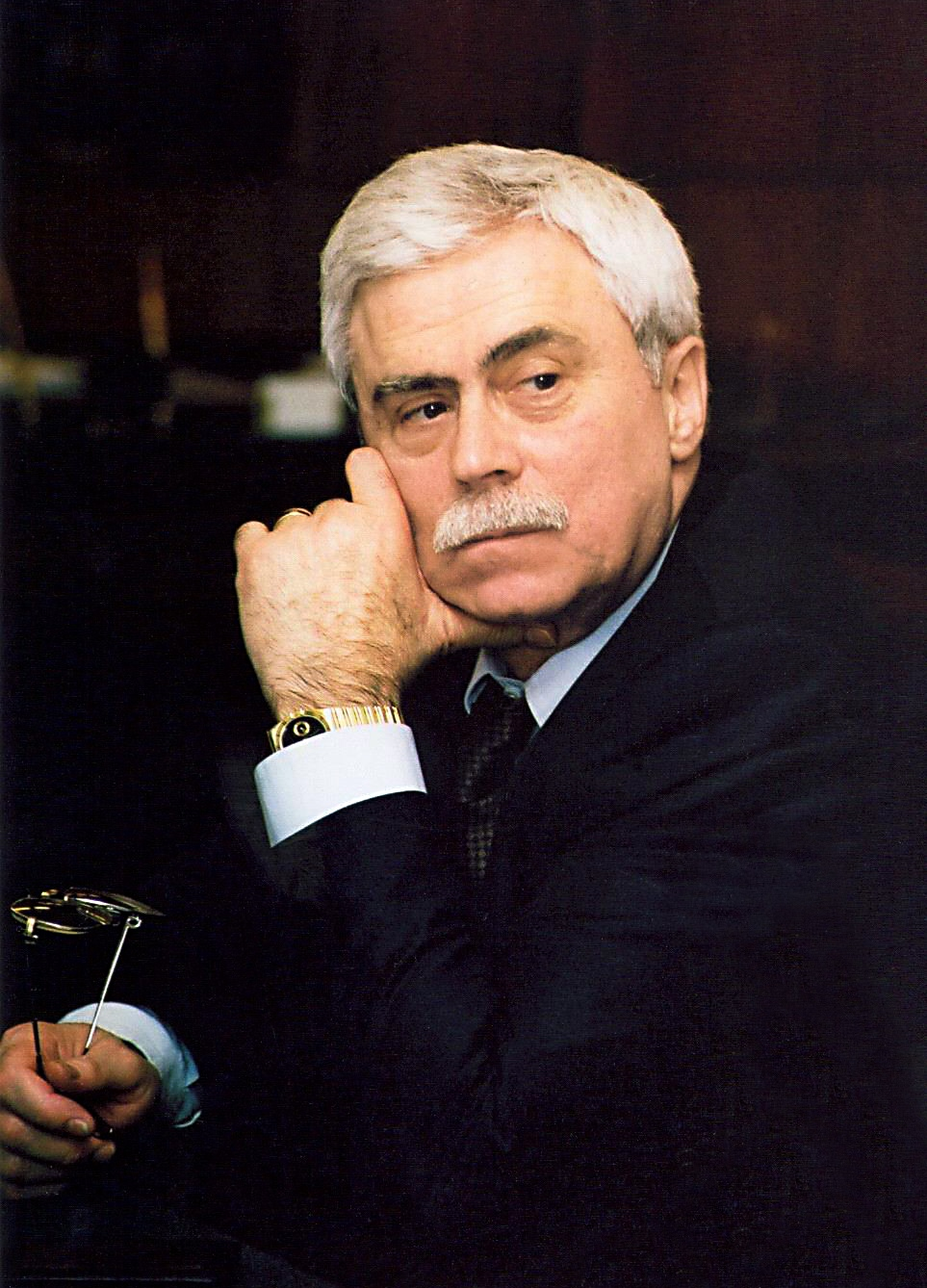
Leonid Shkolnick

Leonid Semenovich Shkolnick (August 9, 1945, Dnipropetrovsk, Ukraine) is a Ukrainian scientist, author, government administrator and academic who has been a researcher at the Academy of Technological Sciences of Ukraine since 2003,

Shkolnick is also the Chairman of the Board of the Union of Consumers of Ukraine and President of the International Academy of Standardization.

Shkolnick's awards include Laureate of the State Award of the UkrSSR in the field of Science and Technology (1988), Honored Employee of Industry of Ukraine (1995), Honorary doctor of Odesa State Academy of Technical Regulation and Quality and Chairman of the Supervisory Board of the Odesa State Academy of Technical Regulation and Quality

Shkolnick received the first rank of a civil servant in 2003 and the Order of Prince Yaroslav the Wise, fifth degree in 2004.

== Early years ==
Shkolnick was born in 1945 in Dnipropetrovsk in what was then the Soviet Union (now Dnipro, Ukraine). In 1963, he graduated from Dnipropetrovsk Industrial Technical School as a metallurgist technician. Between 1963 and 1964, he worked as a mill operator of the slitting lines shop at the Petrovskyi Metallurgical Plant in Dnipropetrovsk. Semenovich became an engineering technician later at the same plant.

In 1964, he began service in the Soviet Army in a military construction unit. While in the army, he also worked as a war correspondent for the Defender of the Motherland newspaper of the Odesa Military District Shkolnick was discharged in 1967.

== Factory technician and engineer ==
In 1967, Shkolnick started working as a technician at the Ukrainian State Institute for Design of Metallurgical Plants. In 1977, he graduated from the Dnipropetrovsk Metallurgical Institute with a degree in metallurgical engineering. By the time he left in 1990, Semenovich had become a chief engineer of projects for many organizations in the Ukrainian SSR and the USSR.

== Administrator ==
In 1998, Shkolnick became the General Director of the "Prydniprovia" Association enterprises and institutions of the Dnipropetrovsk region. In 1998, he became Deputy Chairman of the State Committee of Ukraine for Consumer Protection.

From 2000 to 2005, Shkolnick served as Chairman of the State Committee of Ukraine on Technical Regulation and Consumer Policy Deputy Chairman of the Interdepartmental Council for Consumer Protection under the Cabinet of Ministers of Ukraine. Deputy Chairman of the Council for Standardization and as member of the Commission on Improving Legislation in the field of Foreign Economic Activity .

From 2000 to 2005, Shkolnick served on the Coordinating Committee on Fighting Corruption and Organized Crime under the President of Ukraine, as Deputy Chairman of the Advertising Council, as a member of the Interdepartmental Commission on Biological and Genetic Security under the National Security and Defence Council of Ukraine and a member of the Council of the International Standardization Organization (ISO).

In 2007, Shkolnick became a Professor of the Odesa State Academy of Technical Regulation and Quality, serving there until 2009.

== Social and political activities ==
For a long time, he worked in local government bodies as a Deputy and First Deputy Chairman of the Zhovtnevyi District Council of the city of Dnipropetrovsk, was a member of the executive committees of the Zhovtnevyi District Council of the city of Dnipropetrovsk and Dnipropetrovsk City Council (see Reference and biographical publication. Who is who in Dnipropetrovsk region: Outstanding people of the city of Dnipropetrovsk. - Publishing house "Ukrainian Academy of Heraldry, Trademark and Logo". — Kyiv, 2005). Was a member of the Board of Directors for CIS-US trade and economic cooperation.

- 1996—2000 — a member of the Commission on Economic Cooperation with Japan under the President of Ukraine.
- 1997—2000 — a non-staff adviser to the President of Ukraine.
- 1999—2003 — founded and headed the public organization "Union of Consumers", the city of Dnipropetrovsk.
- 1999—2002 — a member of the political council, Vice-Chairman of the Inter-Regional Reform Coalition (IRRC) party, Chairman of the Dnipropetrovsk regional organization of the IRRC.
- 2002 — a candidate for people's deputies of Ukraine from the "For United Ukraine" coalition ("Za Yedynu Ukrainu") (list number 69).
- 2003 — initiated the creation and was elected as a Chairman of the Board of the All-Ukrainian public organization "Union of Consumers of Ukraine".
- 2004 — initiated the creation and was elected as a President of the International Academy of Standardization.
- 2006—2007 — Secretary of the Coordinating Council for Consumer Protection under the Cabinet of Ministers of Ukraine.
- 2007—2009, 2010—2011 — Chairman of the Public Council under the State Consumer Standard of Ukraine.
- 2010—2013 — adviser to the Prime Minister of Ukraine (on a voluntary basis).
- 2015 — Honorary Member of the Ukrainian Foreign Policy Association.

== Journalistic activities ==
- 1999—2000 — Chairman of the Editorial Board of the "Consumer and Market" magazine.
- 2001—2002 — Deputy Chairman of the Editorial Board of the "Man and Law" magazine.
- 2004—2008 — Chairman of the editorial boards of the "Consumer + Power" and "Consumer + Market" magazines.
- 2006 — at the VI International competition in the field of journalism, he was awarded the Golden Pen Award in the category "Discovery of the year".
- Chairman of the Editorial Board of the "Norms and Rules of the Wine Market of the European Union" collection (2003).
- Chairman of the Editorial Board of the "Consumer Law of Ukraine" legal collection (2004).
- Member of the Editorial Board of the "Metallurgical and Mining Industry" journal (since 2016).
- Author of the "Fundamentals of the Concept of National Food Security of Ukraine" monograph (2005).

== Publications ==
- Co-author with M.Ya.Azarov and L.V.Kolomiiets of the "Technical Aspects of State Policy of Consumer Protection" monograph (2007), 2nd edition (2010).
- Co-author with Yu.F.Melnykov and V.M.Novykov of the educational book "Fundamentals of Food Safety Management" (2007).
- Co-author with I.S.Petryshynyi and I.I.Zvarych of the "Technical Regulation on the way of Ukraine to the European Union" book (2010).
- Leonid Shkolnick. "Standards for Consumers: Myths and Кeality". - Proceedings of the IX International Conference "Quality Strategy in Industry and Education" (May 2013, Bulgaria). - Vol. 2., p. 587-590.
- Leonid Shkolnick. Notes of a Caring Person (Zapiski neravnodushnogo"). - Volume 1. Memories, reflections, interviews; Volume 2. Standards for the Consumer: Unreal Reality (2015).
- Co-author with L.V.Kolomiiets and O.V.Tsilvik of the "Metrological Support of Healthcare Institutions in Ukraine" textbook (2017).

== Awards ==
- Jubilee Medal "20 years of Victory in the Great Patriotic War 1941-1945" (1965)
- Medal "Veteran of Labor" (1989) for impeccable military service and conscientious long-term work.
- Order of Prince Yaroslav the Wise, Vth degree (2004),
- Honorary Certificates of the Verkhovna Rada of Ukraine (2010)
- Cabinet of Ministers of Ukraine (2004), Commendation of the Verkhovna Rada of Ukraine (2004).
- 1994 and 1999 - Letter of Acknowledgment from the President of Ukraine.
- 1994 - Medal named after Yu. V. Kondratiuk of the Federation of Cosmonautics of Ukraine.
- 2002 and 2003 - Honorary Order Award "Public Recognition" (II and I degrees) of International Charitable organization "Fund of Public Recognition".
- 2003 - honorary award of the Ministry of Emergency Situations of Ukraine.
- 2004 and 2008 - awards "Excellent Student of Education of Ukraine" and "Anton Makarenko" of the Ministry of Education and Science of Ukraine.
- 2004 - Award "Law and Honor" of the Ministry of Internal Affairs of Ukraine.
- 2004 - Award "For Honor and Service" of the State Tax Administration of Ukraine.
- 2004 - Award "For Conscientious Work" of the Main Department of the State Service of Ukraine.
- 2004 - Honorary Award "For Many Years of Fruitful Work in the Field of Culture" of the Ministry of Culture of Ukraine.
- 2004 - Commander's Cross of the Order of Saint Gregory the Great of the Vatican state.
- 2004 - Order of the Holy Equiapostolic Prince Vladimir the Great of the third degree of the Ukrainian Orthodox Church of the Kyiv Patriarchate.
- 2004 - Honorary Order "Bukovynskyi Amulet" of the Ukrainian Orthodox Church of the Moscow Patriarchate.
- 2005 - Cross of Honor of the highest degree "For the Revival of Ukraine" of the Ukrainian Foundation for Scientific, Economic and Legal Cooperation.
- 2006 - Order of St. Nicholas the Wonderworker of the All-Ukrainian Foundation for international communication "Ukrainian People's Embassy".
- 2007 - Honorary Title "People's Ambassador of Ukraine" of the All-Ukrainian Foundation for International Communication "Ukrainian People's Embassy".

== Family ==
Wife - Kulikova Tatiana Yakovlevna, son - Maxim. Grandson- Simon

== Links ==
- Союзу споживачів України
- Сайт Міжнародної Академії Стандартизації
- Сайт Одеської Державної Академії технічного регулювання та якості
- Розпорядження Президента України "Про призначення Л. Школьника позаштатним радником Президента України"
- Указ Президента України "Про призначення Л. Школьника заступником Голови Державного комітету України у справах захисту прав споживачів
- Постанова Кабінету Міністрів України "Про утворення Координаційної Ради з питань захисту прав споживачів" https://zakon.rada.gov.ua/laws/show/661-2006-р/sp:max25
- Указ Президента України "Про призначення Л.Школьника Головою Держспоживстандарта України
- Указ Президента України "Про присвоєння Л.Школьнику рангу державного службовця
- Указ Президента України "Про призначення Л.Школьника представником України у Раді Міжнародної організації із стандартизації (ISO)»
- Центральна виборча комісія України
- Біографічний довідник, присвячений відомим державним та громадським діячам сучасної України, стор. 955—956. — Вид «К. І.С», Київ, 2004
- В Украине создана Международная Академия стандартизации. Правительственный портал, 2004.
- Леонид Школьник: В Украине с 2006 года нет Государственной программы по защите прав потребителей
- Українська Асоціація зовнішньої політики
- "Так жить нельзя!": Интервью Леонида Школьника газете «Бульвар Гордона»
- "Некачественные еда и алкоголь убивают чаще, чем несчастные случаи": Интервью Леонида Школьника газете "Комсомольская правда в Украине
- Леонід Школьник взяв участь у зустрічі Прем'єр-міністра України Миколи Азарова з представниками громадських організацій та експертами
