= Ivanivska Church, Pryluky =

Church building in Pryluky, Ukraine

Coordinates: 50.5957°N 32.3781°E

Ivanivska Church
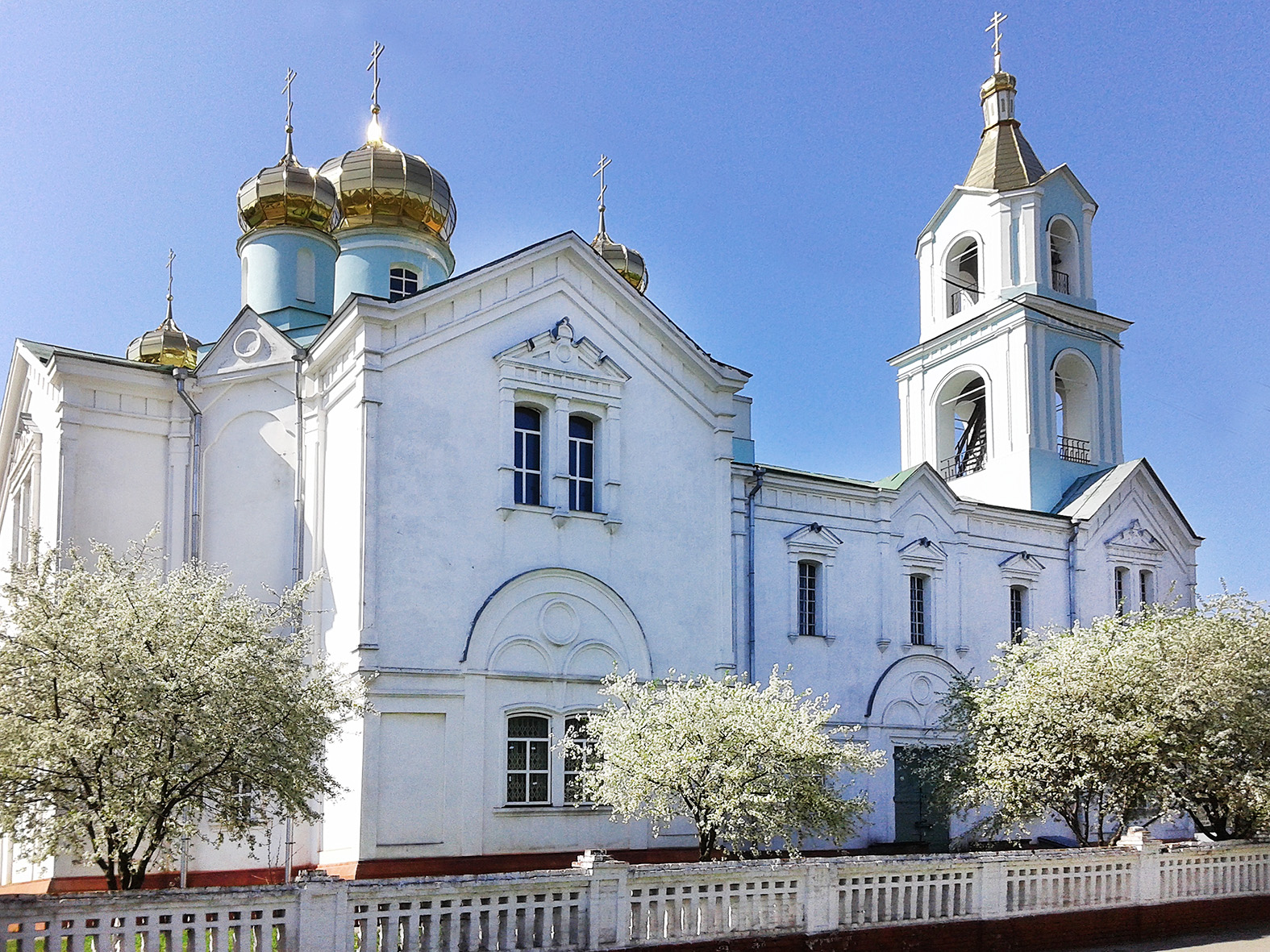

- Location of Pryluky in Ukraine

Ivanivska Church (Ukrainian: Іванівська церква) is an Orthodox diocese church in the city of Pryluky within the Chernihiv Oblast. It is a historical and architectural monument from the middle of the 19th century.

The temple is located on the corner of Kyivska and Ivanivska streets.

== History ==
In 1708–1709, Pryluky colonel Dmytro Horlenko built a wooden Ivano-Dmytrivska Church at his own expense in honor of the saints—the patrons of Hetman Ivan Mazepa and himself. It was located near the gate of the Kiev office Kvashyntsi pasture. This church existed for nearly 70 years until it was replaced in 1780 by a new church, also dedicated to St. John the Baptist and St. Dmytro. This second church was dismantled in the mid-19th century, and a small chapel was built in its place at the altar site.

The new (modern) brick church, dedicated to John the Baptist and the Icon of the Mother of God "Three-Handed", was built at a new location—at the corner of Kyivska and Ivanivska streets. On August 28, 1865, it was solemnly consecrated.

IOriginally, the five-domed church and the three-tiered bell tower stood separately, but in 1910, they were connected by an annex, nearly doubling the size of the religious structure.

In 1893, a chapel dedicated to the family of Emperor Alexander III ("in memory of the miraculous rescue on October 17, 1887," during a train accident) was built in the churchyard, facing the street.

In February 1930, the Ivanivska Church was closed, its crosses and bells were removed, and the building was repurposed as a military warehouse for the 224th Rifle Regiment stationed in Pryluky. The bells were also taken down from the three-tiered bell tower, which stood nearby. The largest bell, weighing 334 kg, was sent by the Bolsheviks for melting down.

Later, the church premises housed a glove factory, a fire station, and, from 1964, a warehouse for the city trade administration.

In 1993, the partially ruined Ivanivska Church was returned to the faithful of the Orthodox Church of the Moscow Patriarchate.

Between 1996 and 2001, the church was fully restored; it was consecrated on January 22, 2001.

== Gallery ==
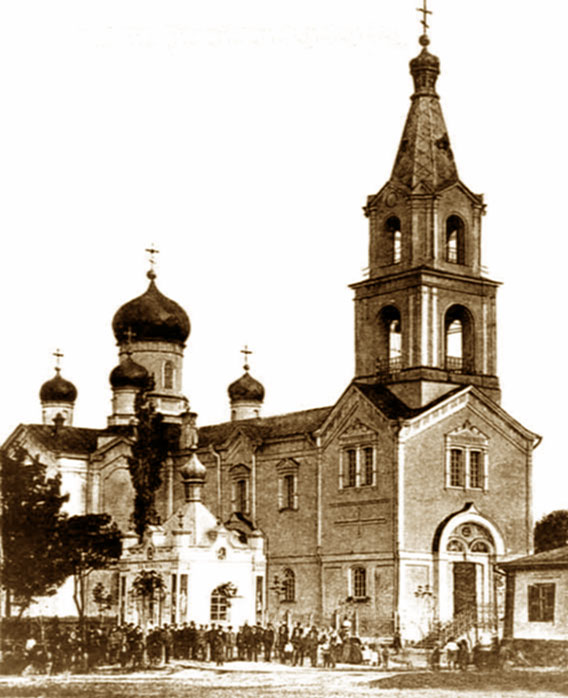
19th century

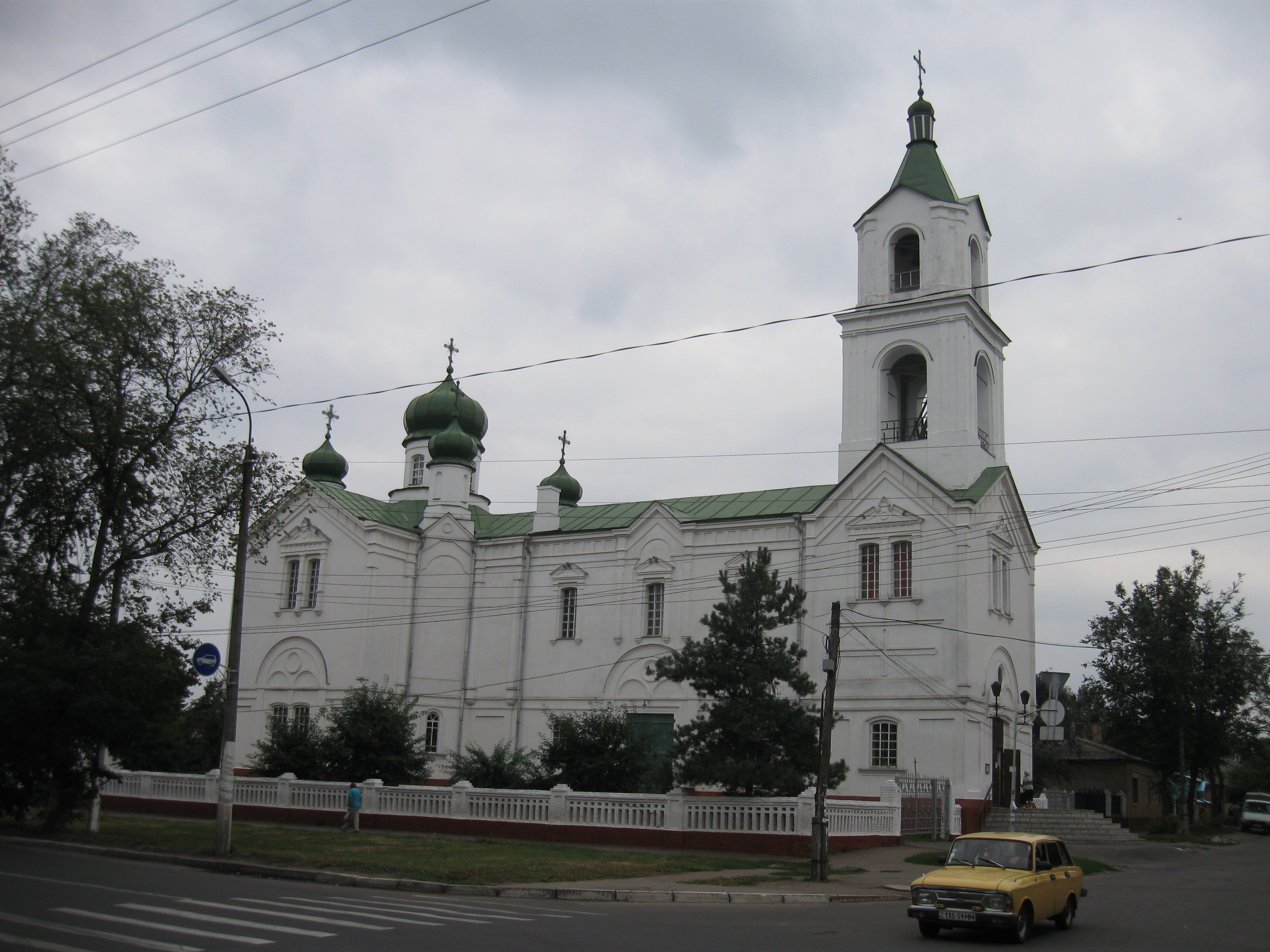

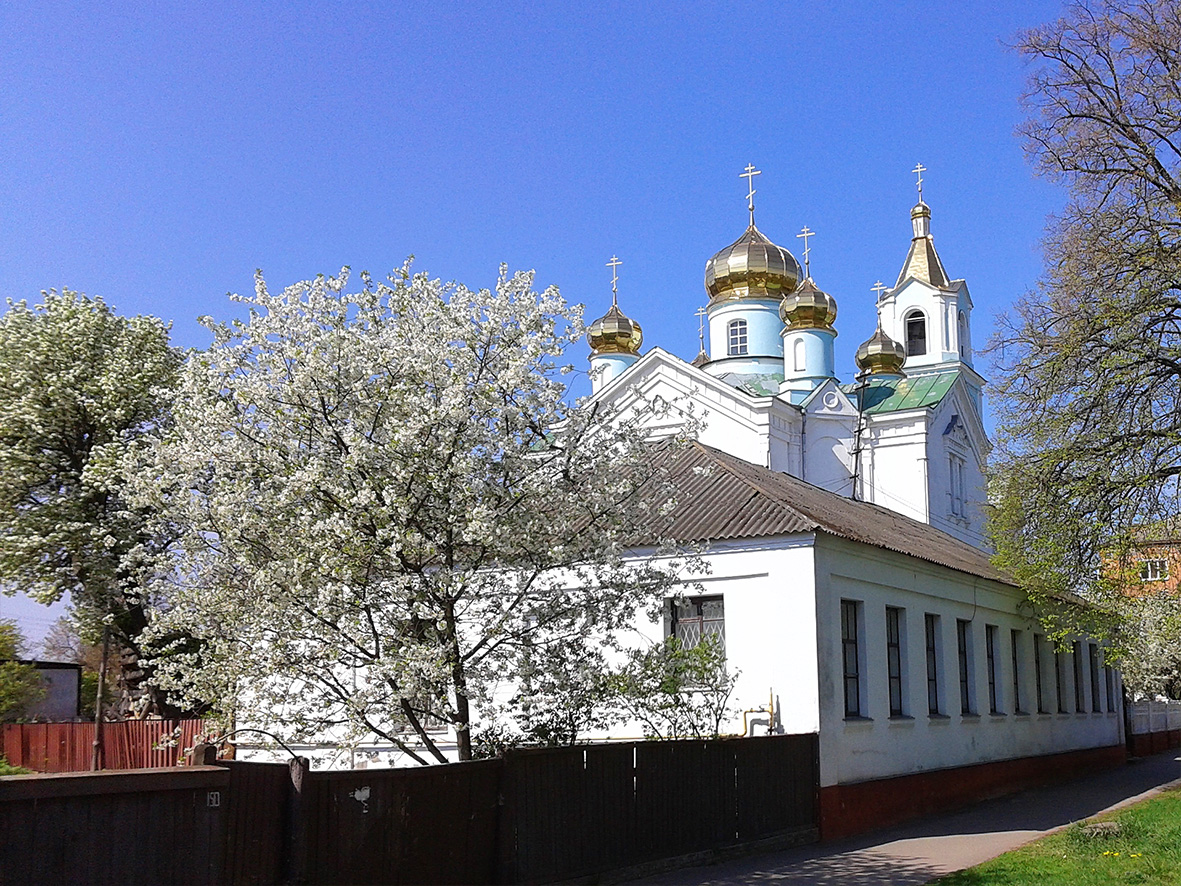

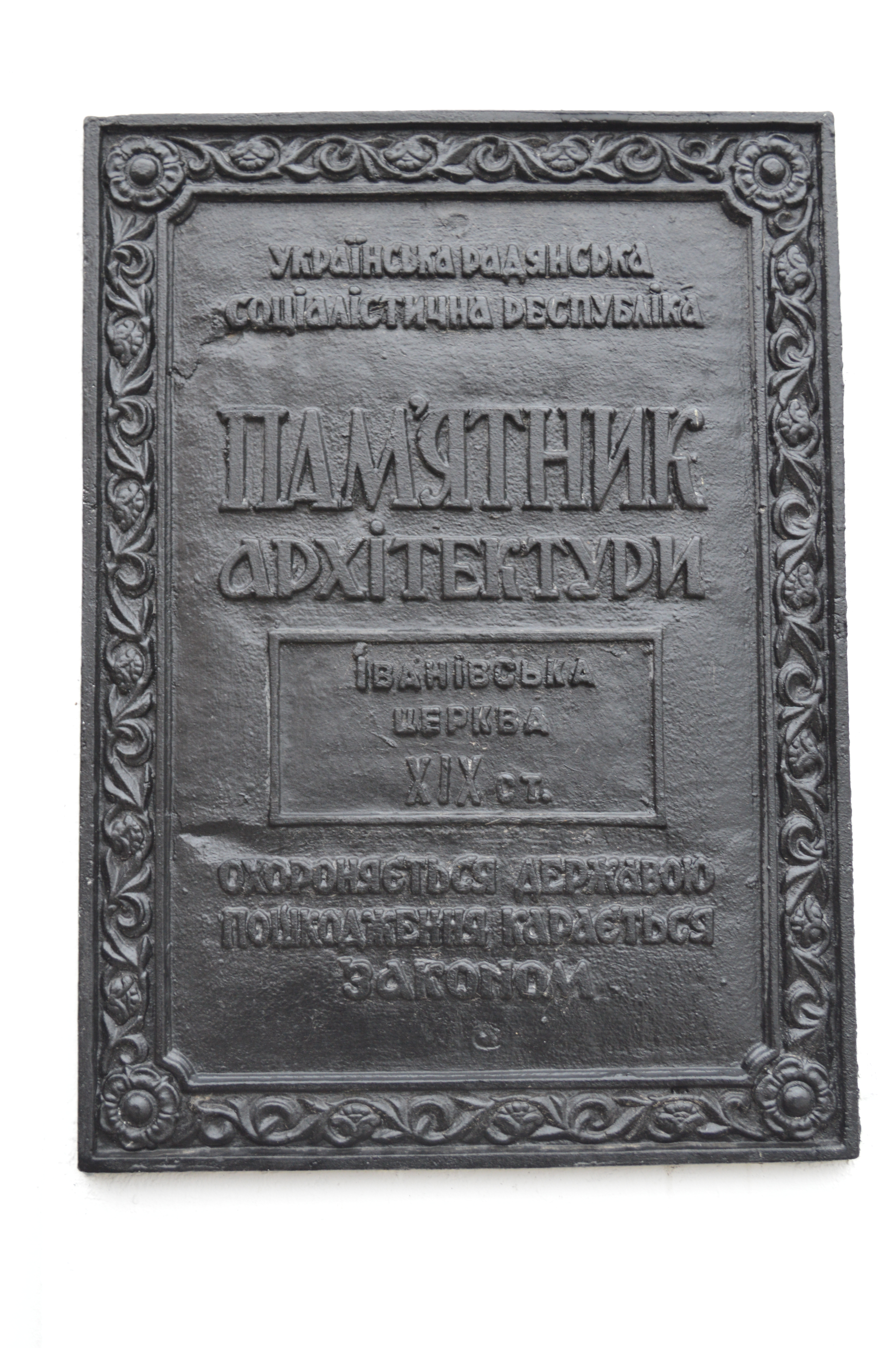

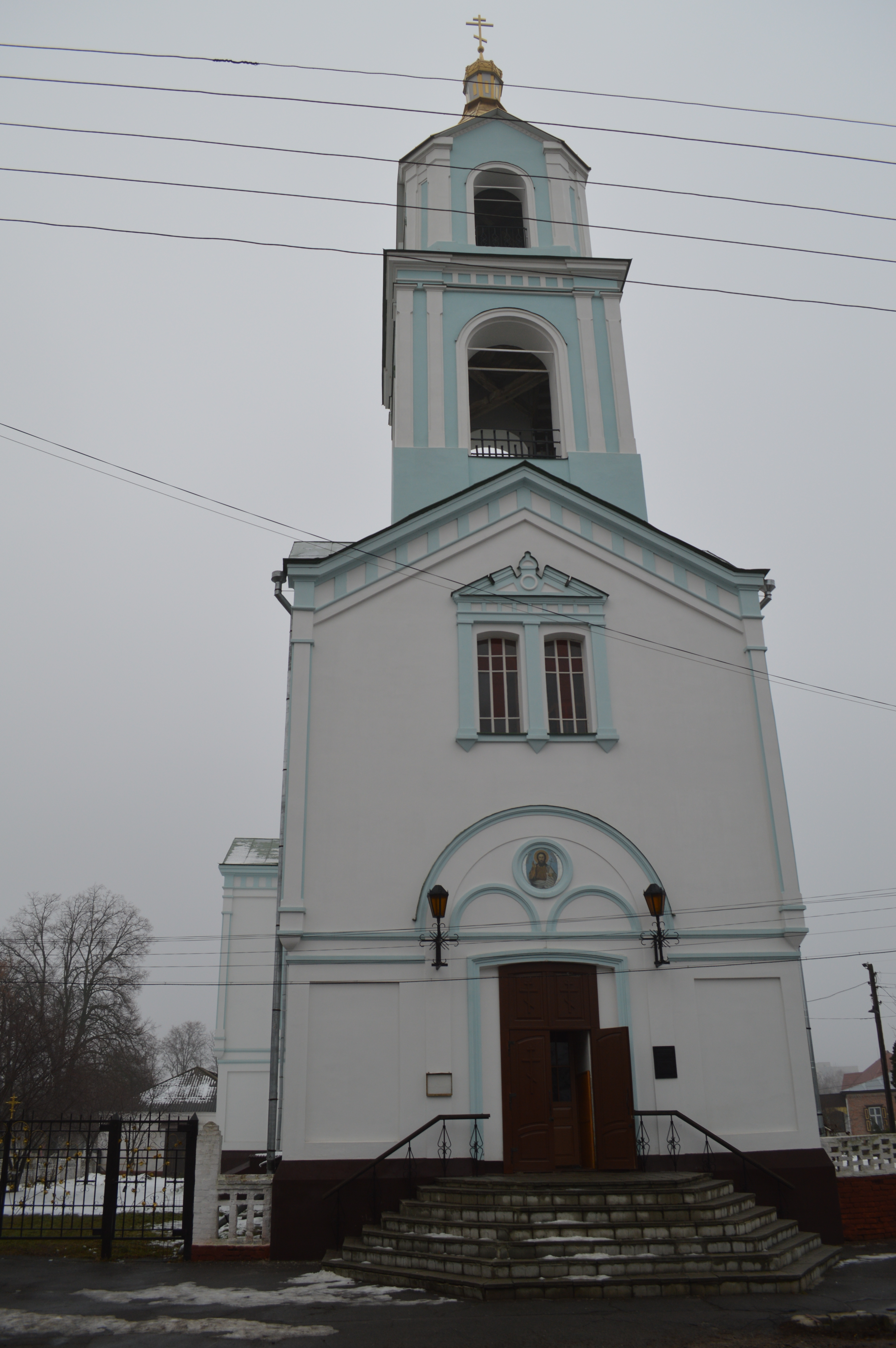

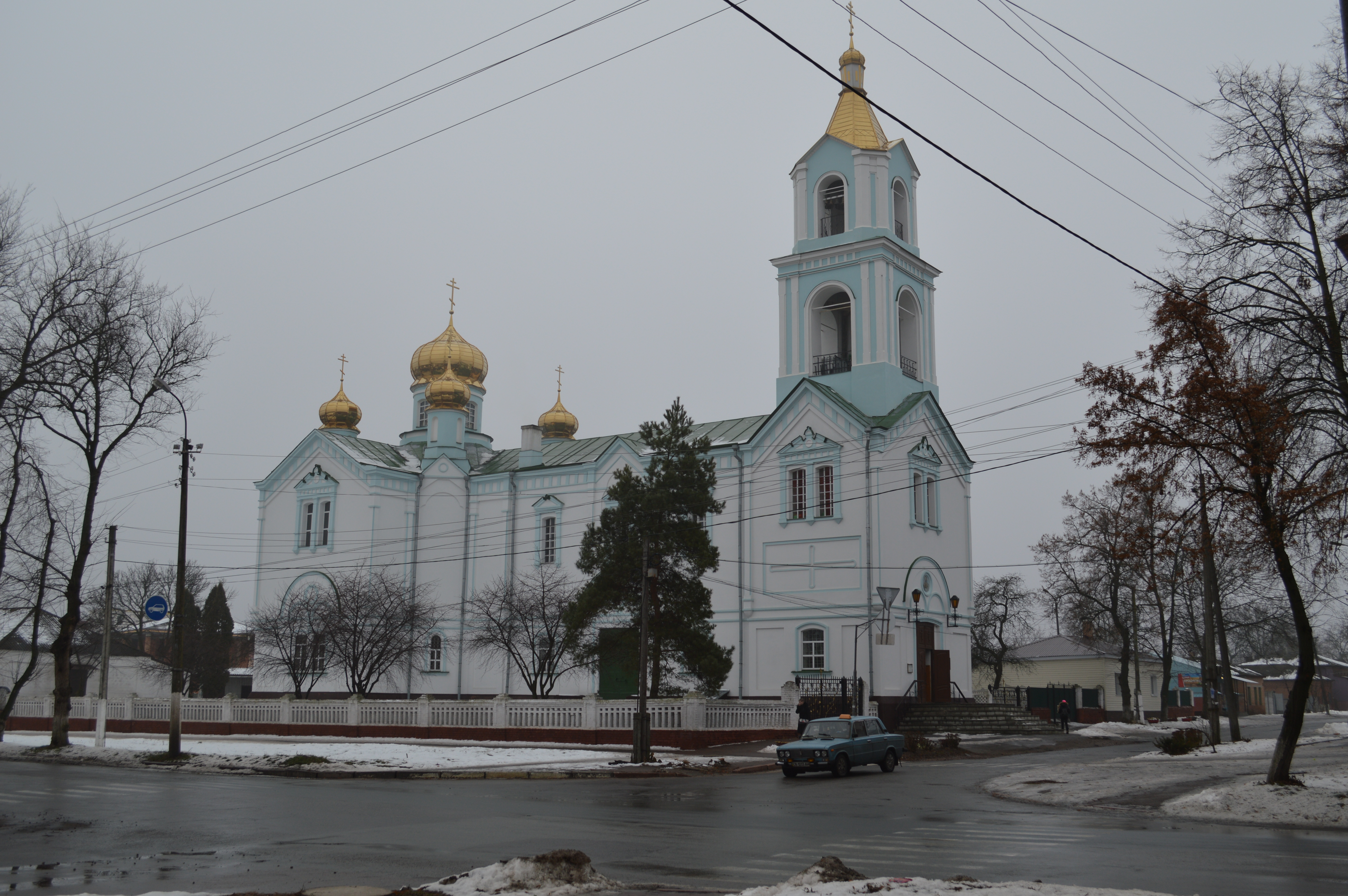
