= Pryluky =

Urban locality in Chernihiv Oblast, Ukraine

Pryluky Прилуки
- City
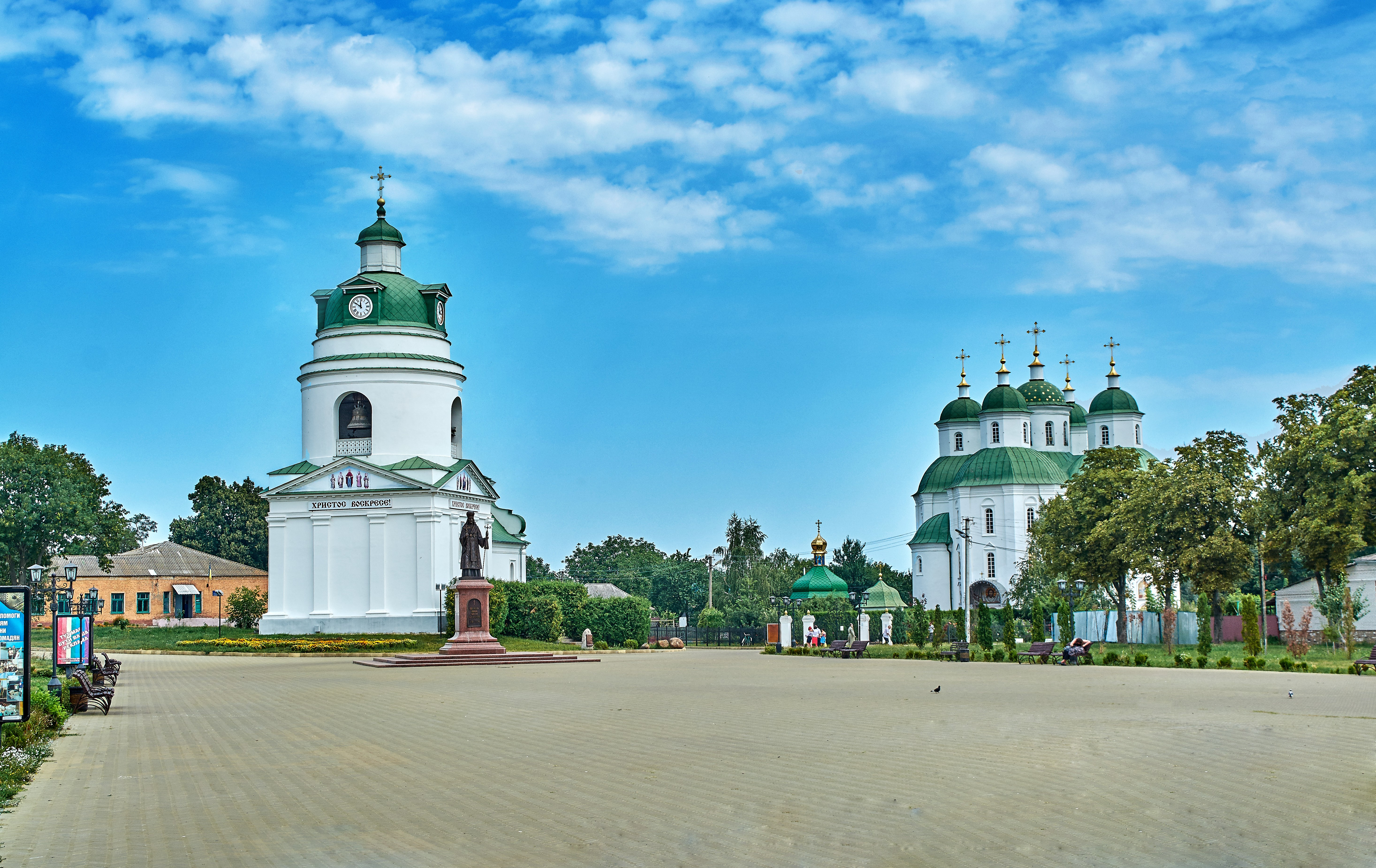
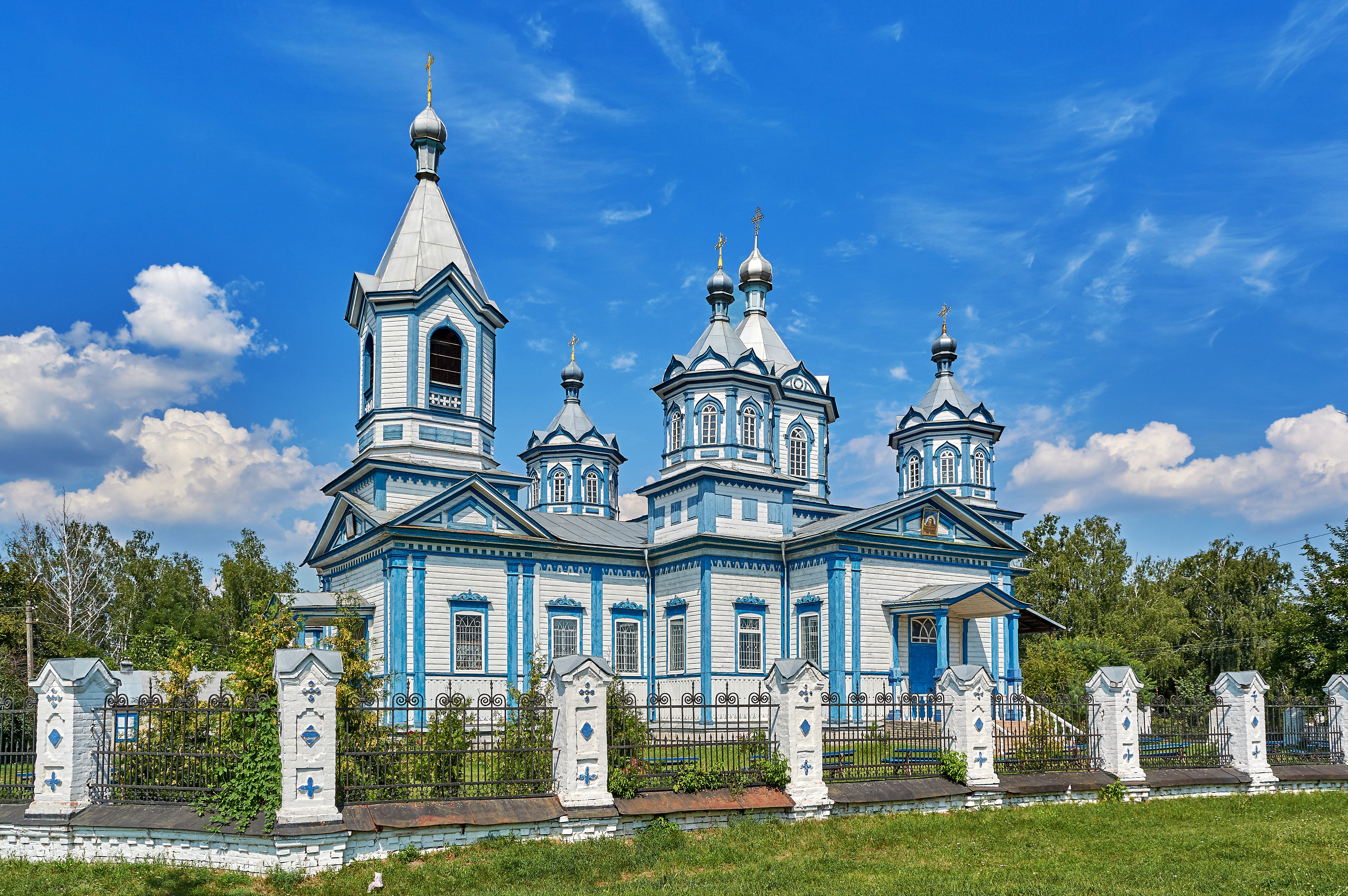
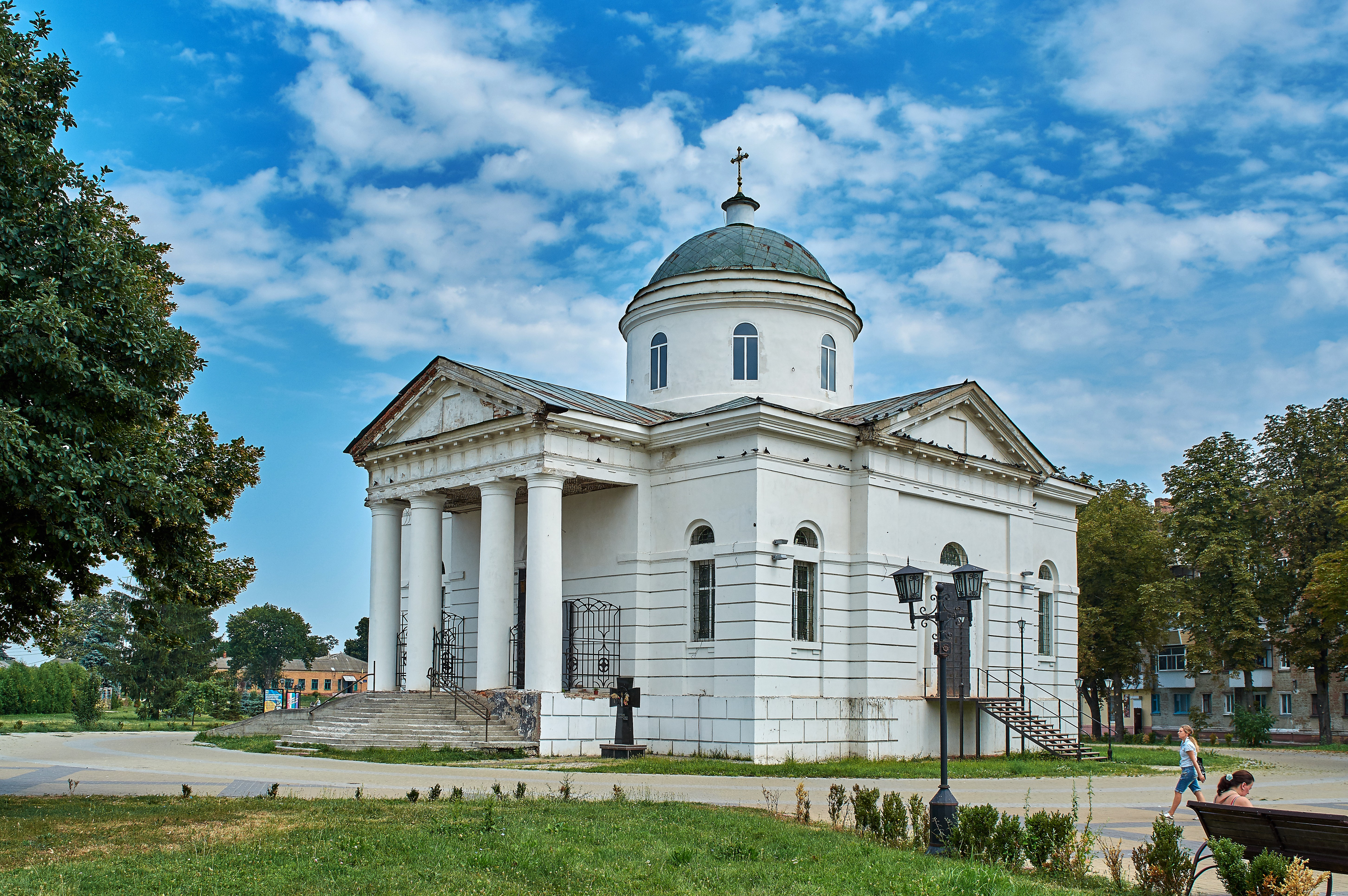
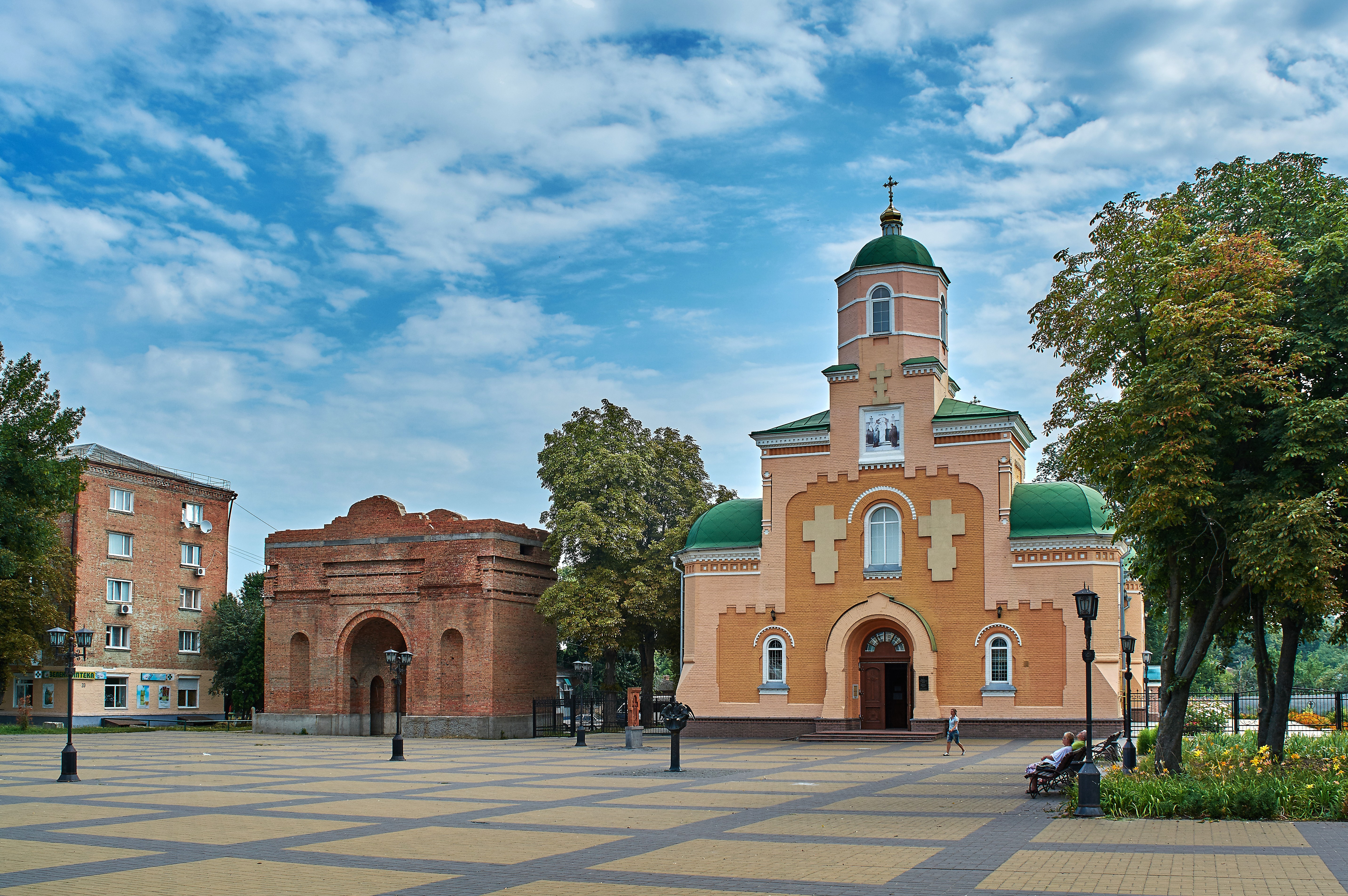
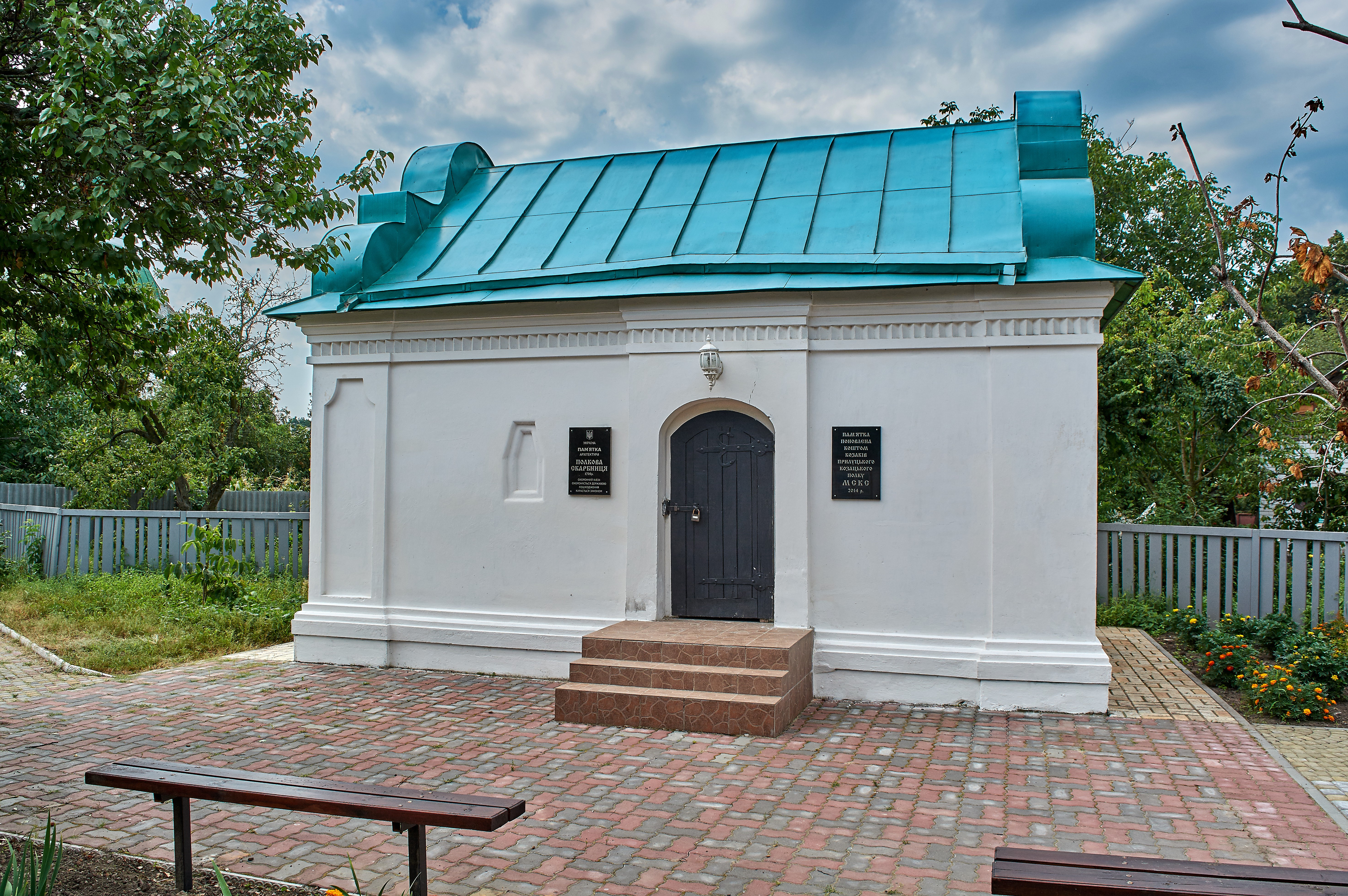
- Clockwise from top: Savior-Transfiguration Cathedral and its bell tower; Cathedral of Nativity of Theotokos; Regimental Treasury Building; Candlemas Cathedral; Church of the Three Holy Hierarchs

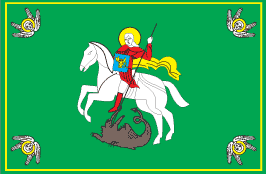
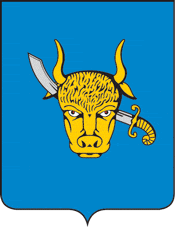
- Flag Coat of arms

- Location of Pryluky in Ukraine Pryluky (Ukraine)
- Coordinates: 50°35′21″N 32°23′08″E
- Country: Ukraine
- Oblast: Chernihiv Oblast
- Raion: Pryluky Raion
- Hromada: Pryluky urban hromada

Area
  - Total: 42 km^{2} (16 sq mi)

Population (2022)
  - Total: 51,637
- Website: http://pryluky.org/

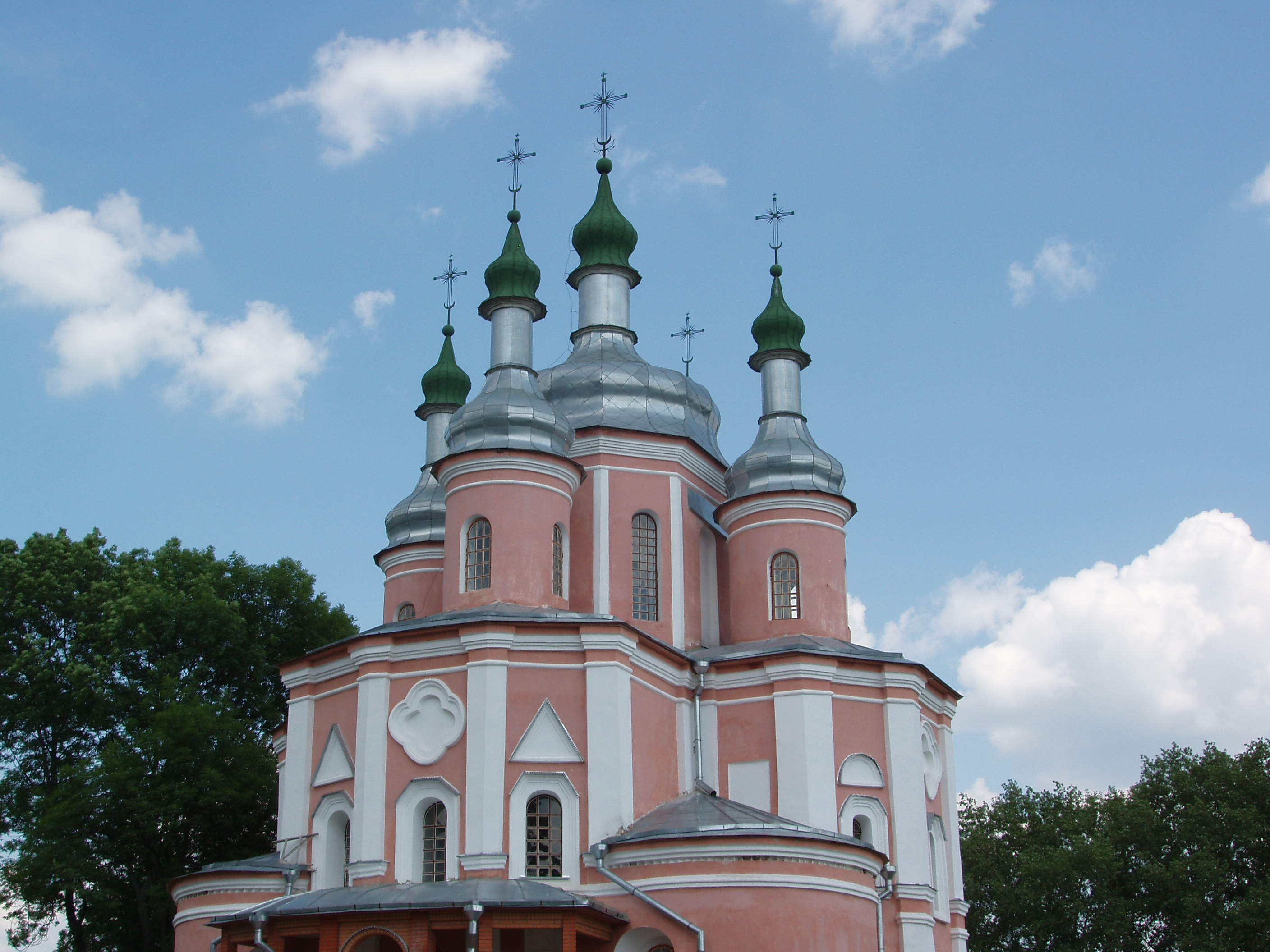
A church in the Hustynia Monastery near Pryluky

Pryluky (Ukrainian: Прилуки [prɪˈlukɪ]) is a city and municipality located on the Udai River in Chernihiv Oblast, north-central Ukraine. It serves as the administrative center of Pryluky Raion (district). Located nearby is the Pryluky air base, a major strategic bomber base during the Cold War, which is Ukraine's largest airfield. Population: 51,637 (2022 estimate).

== History ==
=== Antiquity and Medieval era ===
Archeological excavations have shown that a settlement on the territory of the present-day city dates back to the second millennium BC. According to one explanation, the city derived its name from its location, being situated on a turn in the river that looked like a bow when viewed from above. Another theory holds that the city's name connotes the idea of being situated “on floodplain meadows”.

Pryluky was first mentioned in 1085 by Prince Vlаdimir Monomakh in his Precepts To My Children. That year the city-fortress sheltered the prince and his entourage from the horde of Polovtsy and soon the prince's armed forces, strengthened by the Pryluky militia, routed the enemy. However, in 1092 the Polovtsy attacked the fortress once more wiping out the whole population and sacking the city.

During the period of Kyivan Rus' the city was part of Pereyaslav and Chernihiv principalities. Later, the city was repeatedly plundered by eastern nomadic tribes and became a centre of internecine wars between Ruthenian princes. In 1239, Pryluky was destroyed by the Mongols; in 1362, the city was conquered by Lithuanian feudal lords. But the citizens always staunchly defended Pryluky, fighting for their freedom and dignity.

=== Early Modern period ===
After the Union of Lublin of 1569, according to which the city came under the rule of the Polish nobility, many inhabitants of Pryluky and nearby villages began to run away, seeking freedom in the vast Dnieper steppes. Oppressed peasants from other areas of central and eastern Ukraine took refuge there too. Settlements founded by the runaways in the late 15th-early 16th centuries occupied large territories in the vicinity of Kyiv and Cherkasy. Thus grew the Cossack community. Scared by the proliferation and popularity of Cossacks, Poland tried to suppress this spontaneous resistance but did so in vain.

In the 17th century the Cossacks took part in the Khmelnytsky uprising. The fertile soil of the Udai basin proved itself attractive not only to marauders, but also to hard-working people fleeing from backbreaking toil. The number of inhabitants of Pryluky and adjacent villages grew considerably in the 17th century. One of the documents kept in the archives of Stockholm, Sweden stated that there were 800 chimneys, i.e. 800 houses, in Pryluky in 1632. Assuming that each house accommodated at least six persons, about 5,000 people lived in the city at that time.

In 1648, Hetman Bohdan Khmelnytsky introduced a new system of territorial-administrative division in Ukraine, having divided the country into regiments. Under this system the city of Pryluky became the military center of the Pryluky Regiment and Colonel Ivan Shkurat-Melnychenko was appointed its first commander. The regiment comprised about 2,000 Cossacks, who actively participated in many battles during the war of 1648–1654. For instance, the entire Pryluky Regiment of Cossacks, led by I. Shkurat, died fighting valiantly in the Battle of Berestechko in 1651. The Pryluky Regiment, under Colonel Yakiv Voronchenko, demonstrated thorough military prowess in defeating a large Polish unit in June 1652. The regiment also took part in campaigns against Poland and Turkey.

=== Russian rule ===
Girded with a high rampart surmounted by guns, the city of Pryluky looked quite formidably at the time. However, in the second half of the 18th century, the border was moved far to the south for political and military reasons and the necessity for fortified cities like Pryluky disappeared. Olexandr Yakubovych was the last colonel of Pryluky. In 1781, the Cossack regime was abolished in Ukraine and Pryluky became an uyezd centre of Chernigov Viceroyalty (1782-1796), later becoming part of the Malorossiya Governorate, and from 1802 the Poltava Governorate. Under the rule of the Russian Empire Pryluky was a centre of makhorka trade, crafts, industry and agriculture.

=== Interwar Ukraine ===
On 6 March 1918, Pryluky became the seat of Pereyaslavshchyna, a newly established zemlia of the Ukrainian People's Republic, which was disbanded on 29 April 1918 by Hetman of Ukraine Pavlo Skoropadsky, who brought back old governorate divisions of the Russian Empire. After 1920, it was administratively located in the Poltava Governorate of Ukraine.

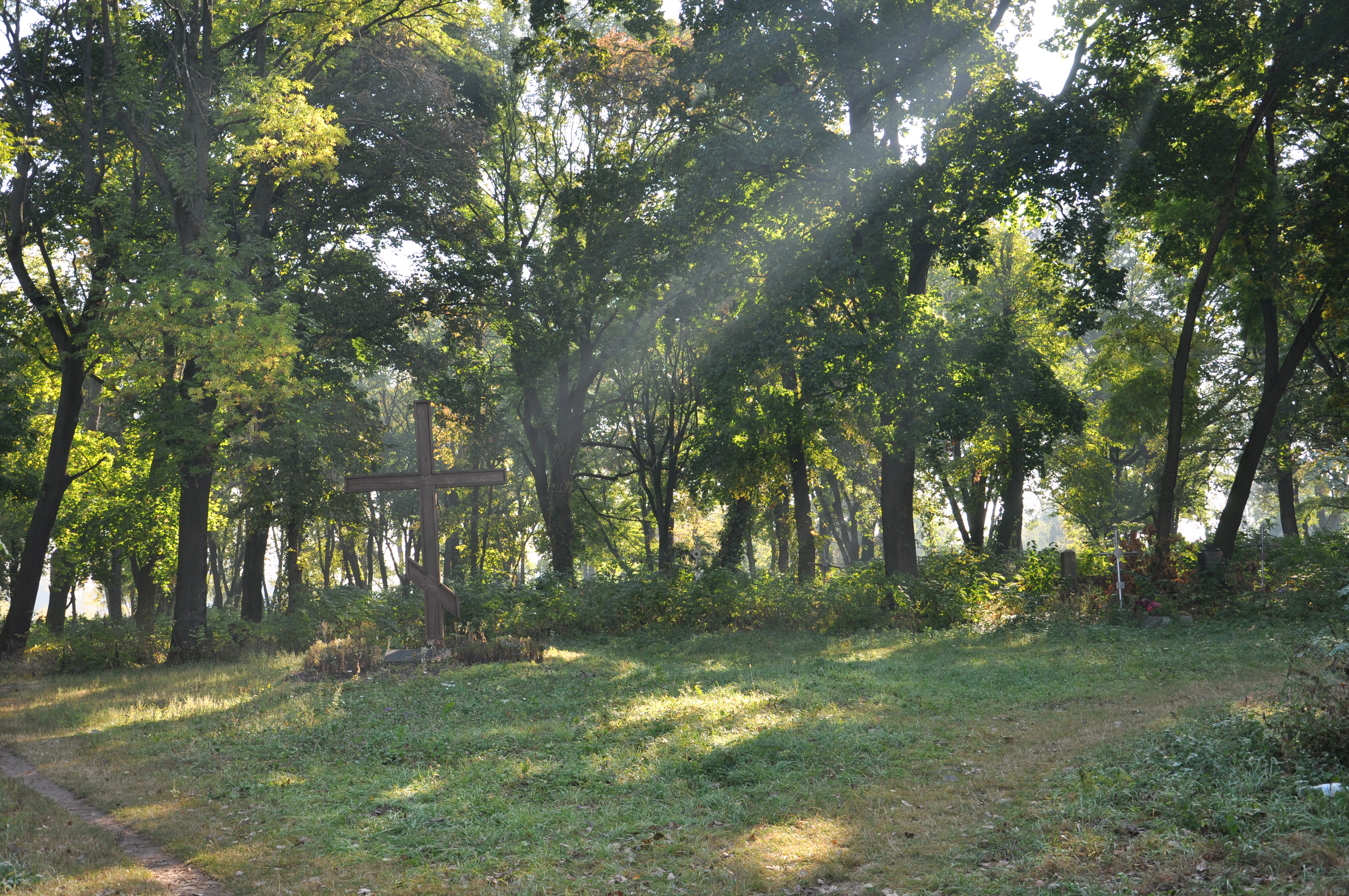
Memorial to Holodomor victims

After the 1930s, significant economic development started in the city, and it became a centre of light and food industry, housed a furniture factory, a machine building plant, a foundry and several oil wells. Several technical, medical and pedagocial schools, as well as a number of scientific establishments and a museum operated here.

Since 1932 Pryluky has been a city within the Chernihiv Oblast.

=== World War II ===
During World War II, the city was occupied by the German Army from 18 September 1941 to 18 September 1943. During the occupation, Jews were recruited for forced labor. On 18 October 1941 a murder operation that had several Jewish victims was carried out. A ghetto was established at the beginning of 1942. From January 1942 groups of 30-40 young healthy men were systematically taken from the ghetto and executed at an unknown location. Most of the Jews of Pryluky were killed in a mass murder operation in May 1942. Another mass murder was carried out by Germans in Pryluky on 10 September 1942. Jews from Polova, Ladan, and Linovitsa of Pryluky County and from Kharitonovka, Podol, Radkovka and Malaya Devitsa of other counties of the Chernigov District were murdered in Pryluky.

=== Independent Ukraine ===
Pryluky is on the list of Ukraine's oldest cities, and in 1995 it was entered in the register of Ukrainian historical cities. Under the auspices of the “Innovations in Cultural Development of the Regions” program, the Pryluky local government is taking measures to restore old folk art traditions as well as seeking historical and architectural records of the city. City inhabitants hope that with time, Pryluky will become a part of the Golden Ring of the Chernihiv Region tour.

Until 18 July 2020, Pryluky was designated as a city of oblast significance and did not belong to Pryluky Raion even though it was the center of the raion. As part of the administrative reform of Ukraine, which reduced the number of raions of Chernihiv Oblast to four, the city was merged into Pryluky Raion.

==== Russian invasion of Ukraine ====
A damaged apartment building in Pryluky after a Russian missile attack on 7 October 2026.

On 28 February 2022, during the opening days of the Russian invasion of Ukraine, a Russian Army tank company was defeated by Ukrainian forces. On 7 March, near Pryluky, the Armed Forces of Ukraine destroyed a convoy of Russian military fuel trucks.

On 13 June 2022, at 13:15, rocket attacks by Russian forces were recorded in Pryluky. Russian missiles struck a facility located near Pryluky. Ammunition detonated. The fire was localized the same day.

On 7 April 2026, another targeted rocket attack by Russian forces caused the fire in the Pryluky townhall.

On 7 October 2026, Pryluky was the target of a large attack by five Russian missiles. One of the missiles hit a five-storey residential building, with the Governor of Chernihiv Oblast, Vyacheslav Chaus, reporting that 20 people died in the attack initially, including five children. The following morning, the death toll was increased to 22 people according to the State Emergency Service of Ukraine, with another 54 people being injured. Ukrainian president Volodymyr Zelensky called the attack one of the "most vile strikes" done by Russia and said that it was purposely done on the birthday of Russian president Vladimir Putin, although Russia did not mention the attack in statements.

== Population ==
Historical population
Year	Pop.	±%
1860	10,000	—
1897	19,000	+90.0%
1926	27,000	+42.1%
1970	57,300	+112.2%
2001	64,861	+13.2%
2022	51,637	−20.4%

=== Ethnic groups ===
Distribution of the population by ethnicity according to the 2001 census:

Ethnic groups in Pryluky
	percent
Ukrainians	92.26%
Russians	6.46%
Belarusians	0.35%
Jews	0.29%
Gypsies	0.11%
Moldovans	0.08%
Armenians	0.05%
Poles	0.04%
Azeris	0.04%
Tatars	0.04%
others	0.28%

=== Language ===
Distribution of the population by native language according to the 2001 census:

Language	Percentage
Ukrainian	92.91%
Russian	6.77%
other/undecided	0.32%

== Geography ==
Climate data for Pryluky (1981–2010)
Month	Jan	Feb	Mar	Apr	May	Jun	Jul	Aug	Sep	Oct	Nov	Dec	Year
Mean daily maximum °C (°F)	−1.4 (29.5)	−0.8 (30.6)	5.0 (41.0)	14.2 (57.6)	21.3 (70.3)	24.0 (75.2)	25.9 (78.6)	25.3 (77.5)	19.2 (66.6)	12.3 (54.1)	4.1 (39.4)	−0.6 (30.9)	12.4 (54.3)
Daily mean °C (°F)	−4.4 (24.1)	−4.1 (24.6)	0.9 (33.6)	8.9 (48.0)	15.2 (59.4)	18.4 (65.1)	20.2 (68.4)	19.1 (66.4)	13.6 (56.5)	7.6 (45.7)	1.2 (34.2)	−3.1 (26.4)	7.8 (46.0)
Mean daily minimum °C (°F)	−7.1 (19.2)	−7.2 (19.0)	−2.6 (27.3)	4.2 (39.6)	9.6 (49.3)	13.2 (55.8)	14.8 (58.6)	13.6 (56.5)	8.9 (48.0)	3.7 (38.7)	−1.3 (29.7)	−5.6 (21.9)	3.7 (38.7)
Average precipitation mm (inches)	42.9 (1.69)	41.2 (1.62)	37.6 (1.48)	47.0 (1.85)	50.5 (1.99)	84.2 (3.31)	86.8 (3.42)	51.6 (2.03)	58.8 (2.31)	44.8 (1.76)	48.2 (1.90)	45.9 (1.81)	639.5 (25.18)
Average precipitation days (≥ 1.0 mm)	9.7	9.6	8.5	8.0	8.1	9.3	9.5	6.8	7.9	7.2	8.9	9.6	103.1
Average relative humidity (%)	86.1	83.4	78.8	69.1	65.7	71.2	73.1	72.3	77.3	81.3	87.6	87.7	77.8
Source: World Meteorological Organization

== Notable people ==
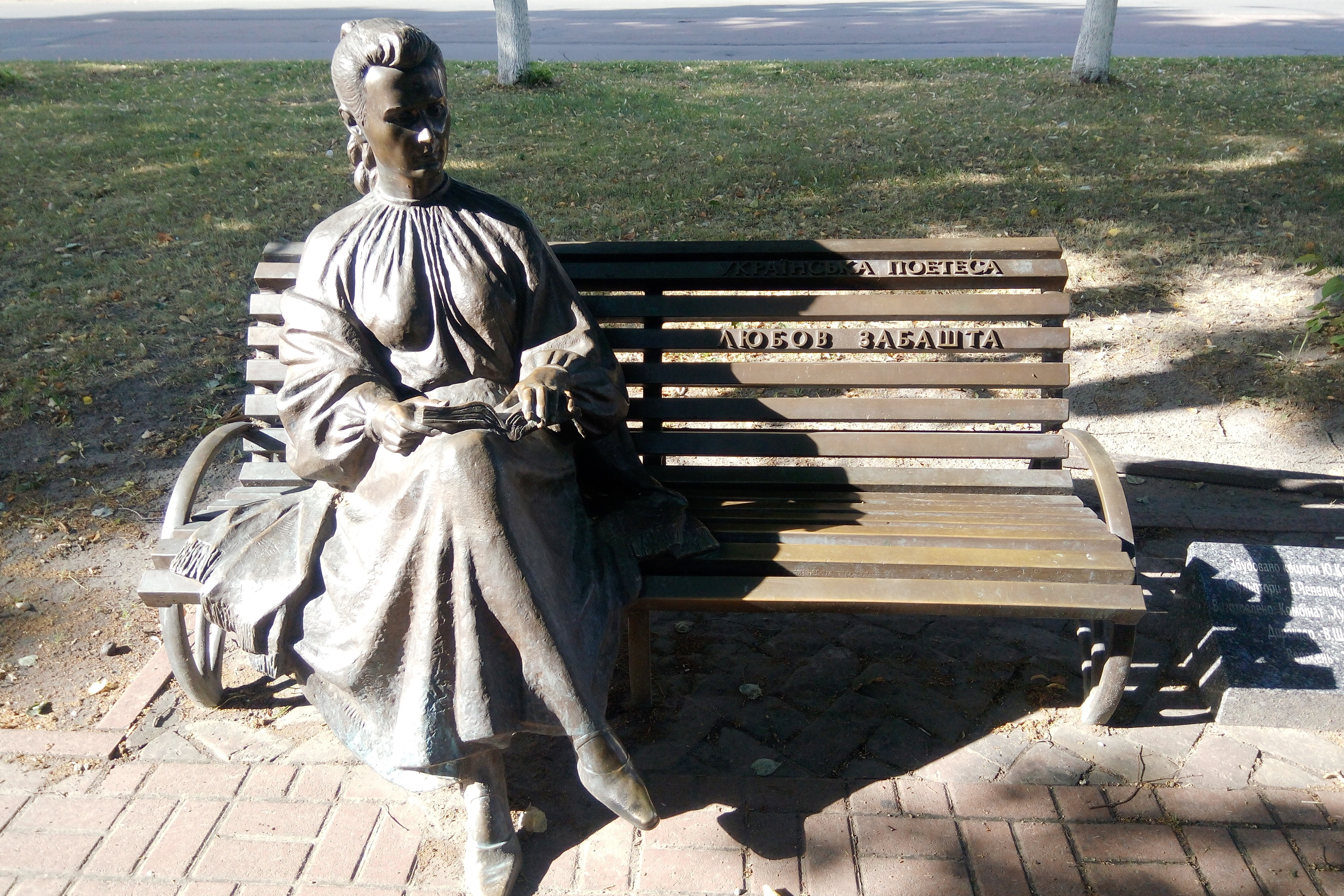
Lyubov Zabashta, Ukrainian poet

- Ioasaph of Belgorod, 18th century bishop, glorified in 1911
- Yevhen Borovyk (b.1985), footballer
- Serhiy Umen (b.1962), footballer
- Irving Chernev (1900–1981), chess player and author
- Viktor Kee, juggler
- Oleg Koshevoy (1926-1943), Soviet partisan
- Yakiv Markovych (1696–1770), Ukrainian Cossack statesman and author
- Marc Sterling (1895-1976), French painter
- Olha Zavhorodnya (b.1983), Ukrainian athlete
- Ilya Likhtarev (1935–2017), biophysicist

== Sights ==
The oldest civil building in the town is the former chancellory and sacristy of the Pryluky Cossack Regiment. The diminutive Baroque church of St. Nicholas (1720) and two cathedrals are in Pryluky. The old five-domed cathedral was built by Cossacks in the 1710s and 1720s in a simplified brand of Mazepa Baroque. The new Neoclassical cathedral (1806) has one cupola and is dedicated to the Nativity of the Theotokos.

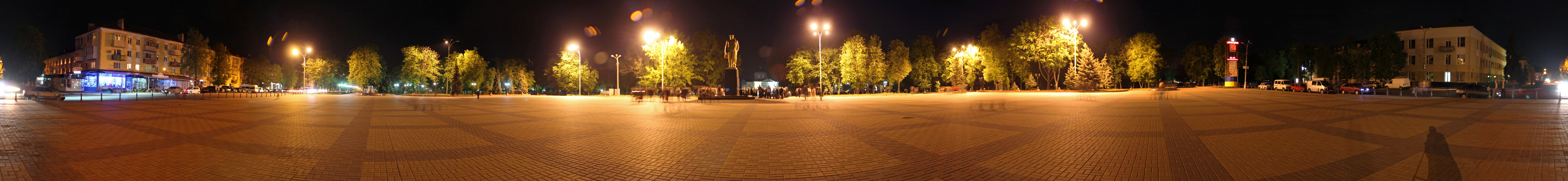
Main square of Pryluky
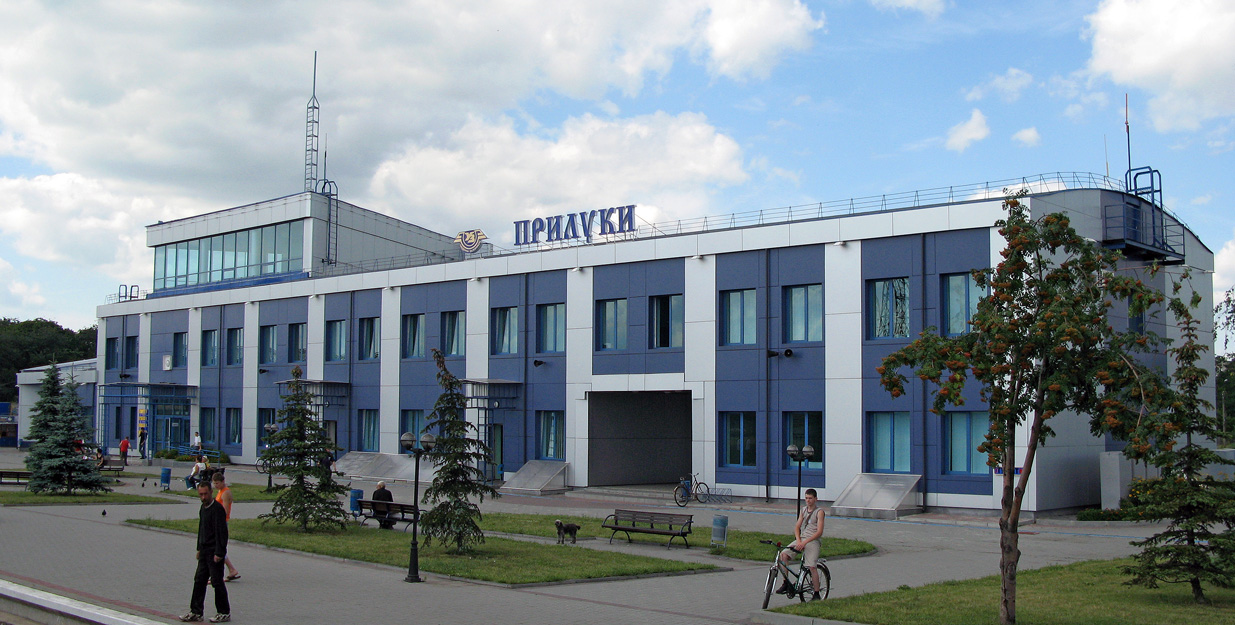
Pryluky Railway Station

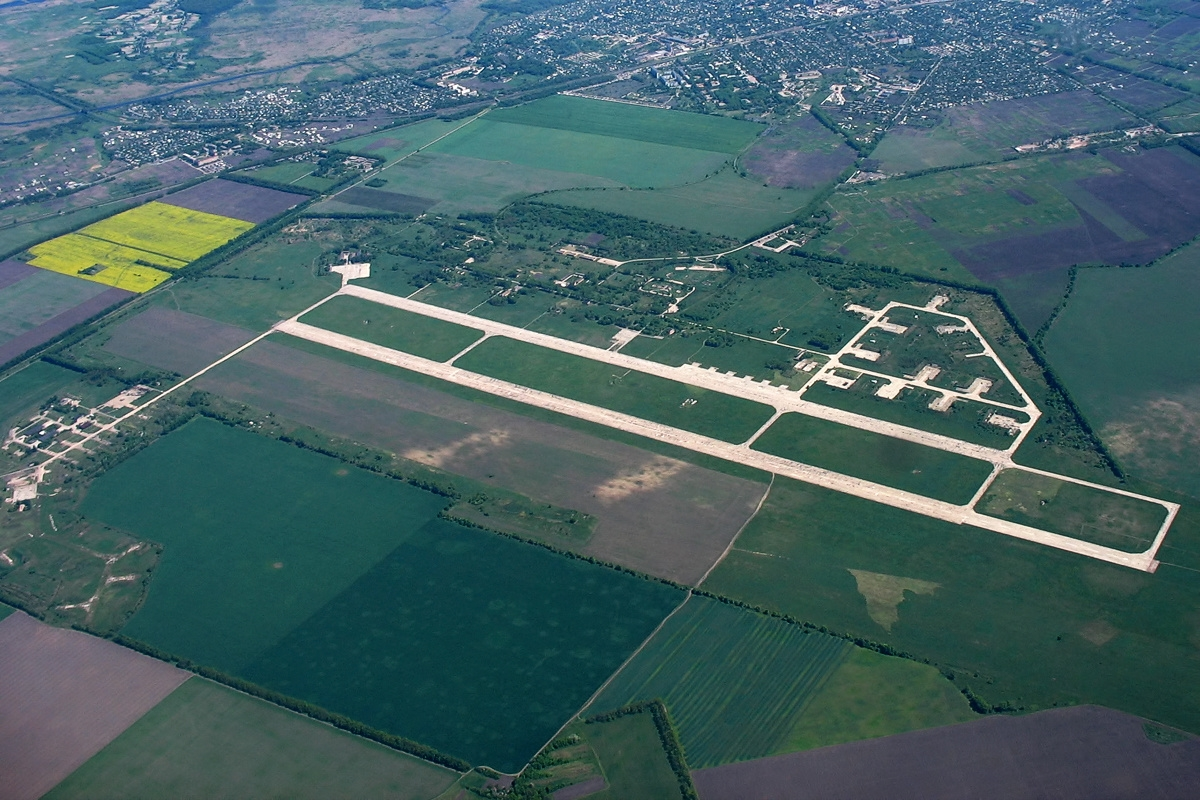
Pryluky Airfield

There are many historical sites within Pryluky and many of them are churches, including:

- Candlemas Cathedral (19th century)
- Cathedral of the Nativity of Theotokos (19th century)
- Church of the Three Holy Hierarchs (19th century)
- Ivanivska Church (19th century)
- Savior-Transfiguration Cathedral (18th century)
- St. Nicholas Church (18th century)
- St. Pantaleon's Church (19th–20th centuries)
- Hustynia Monastery (17th century), located in the nearby village of Hustynia
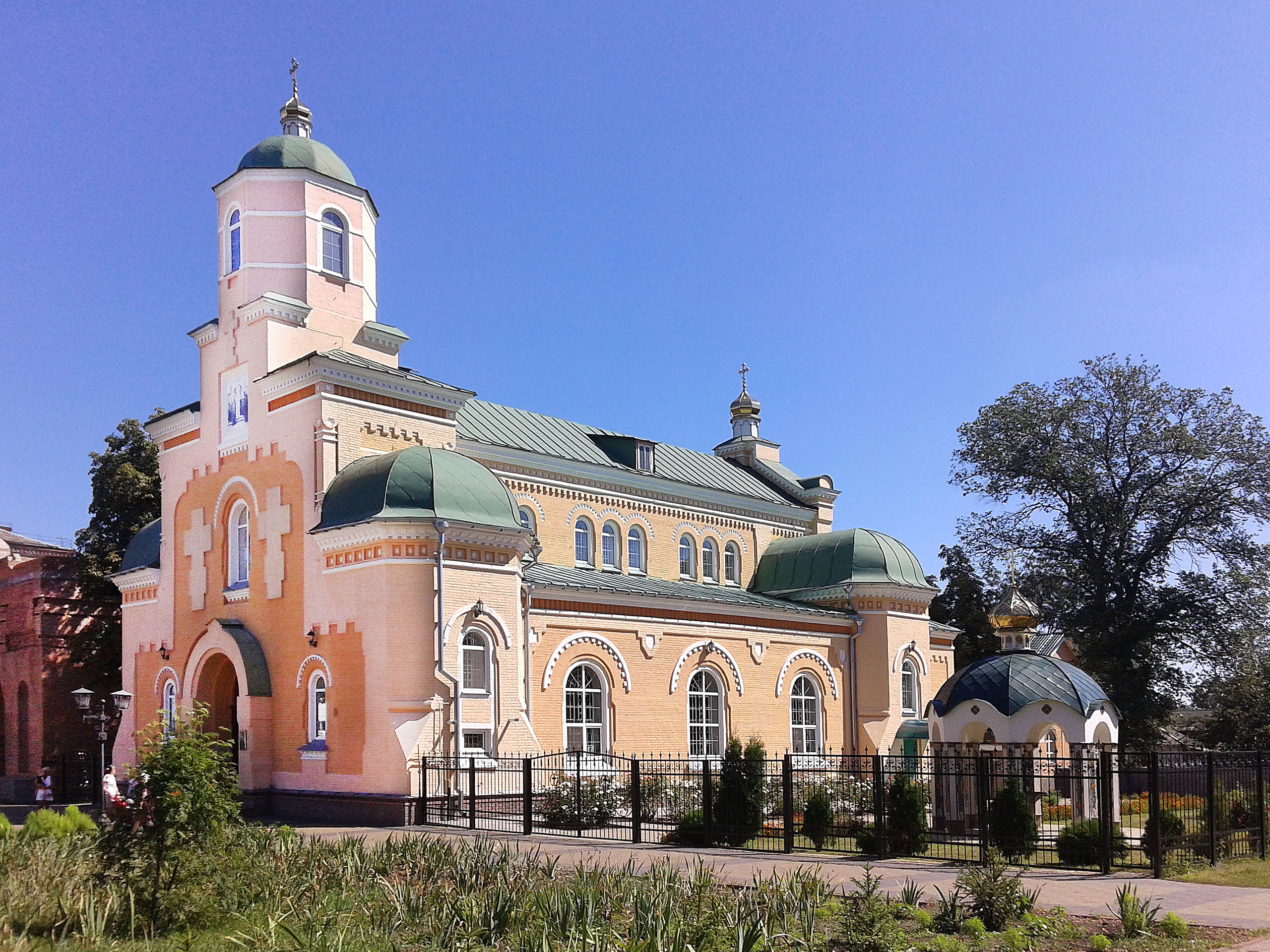
Candlemas Cathedral

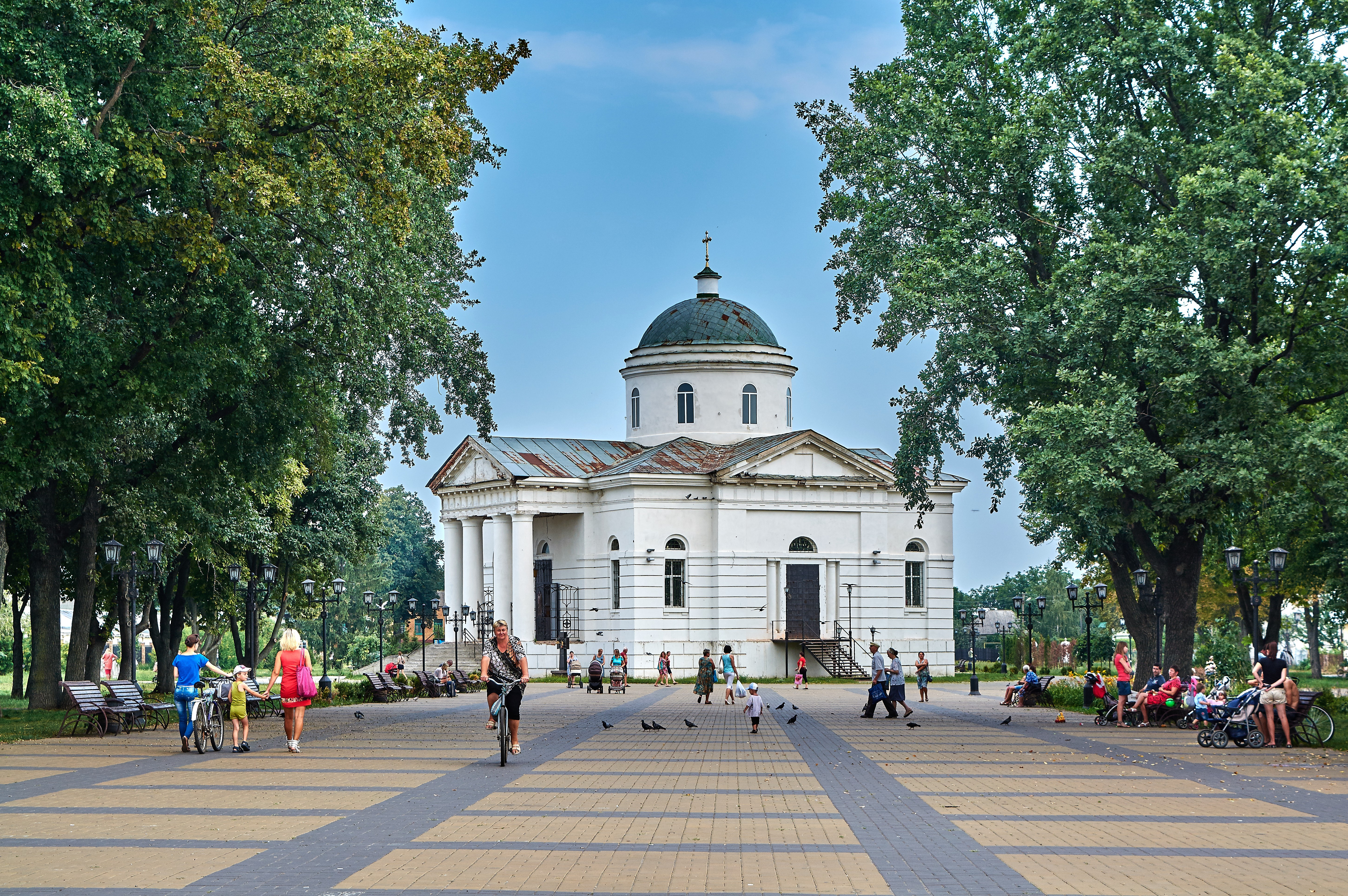
Nativity of the Theotokos Cathedral

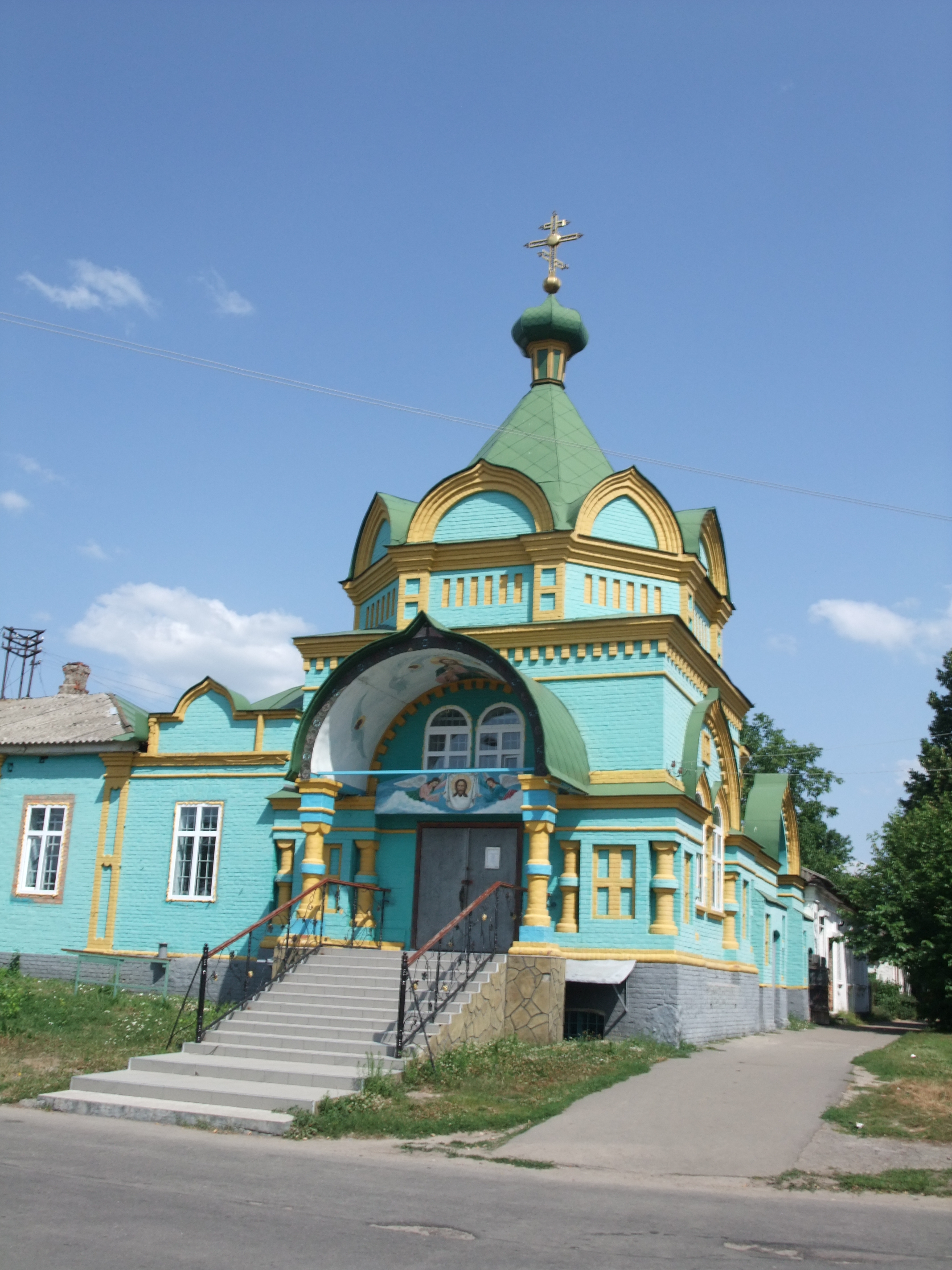
St. Pantaleon's Church

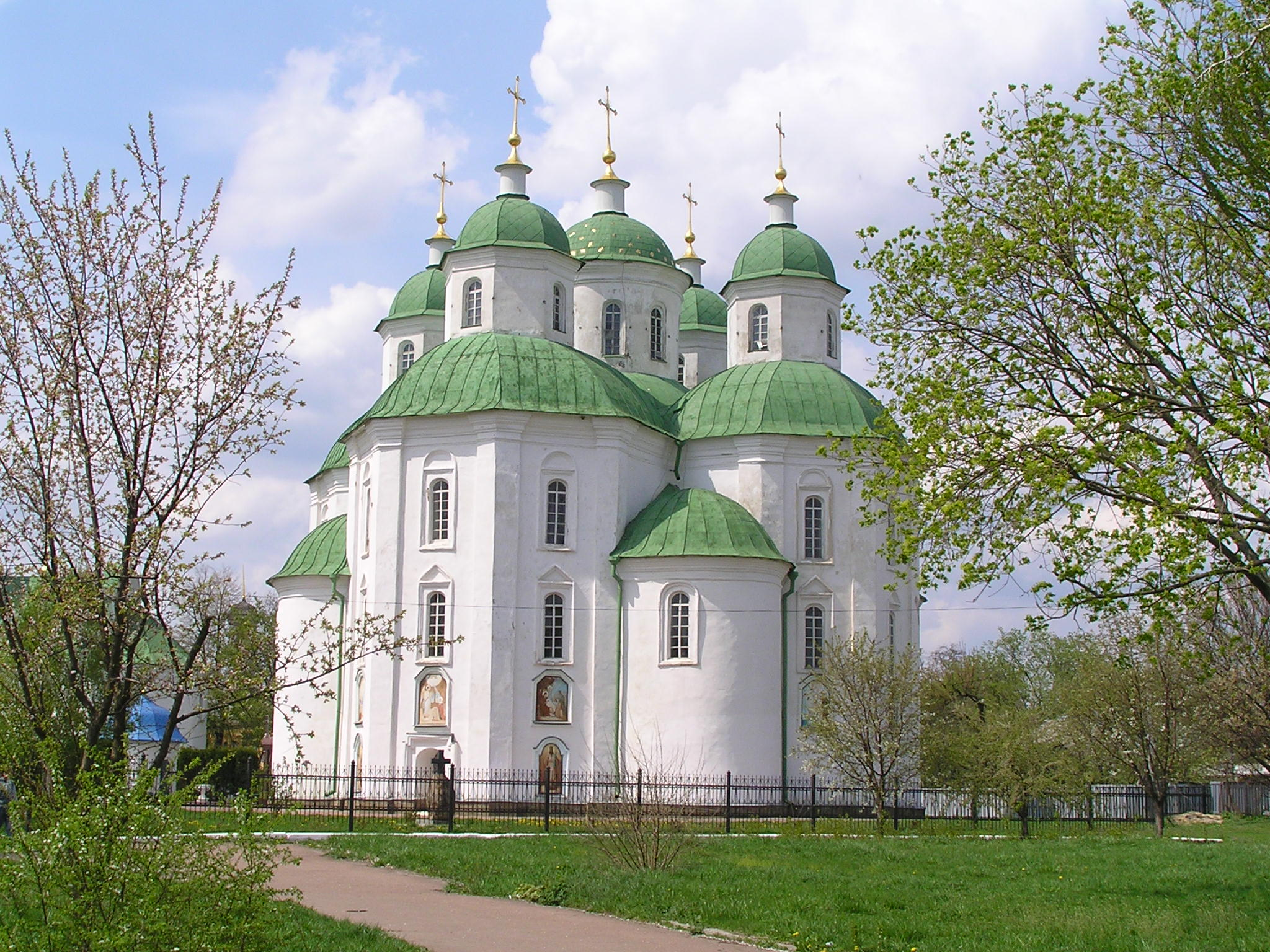
Savior-Transfiguration Cathedral

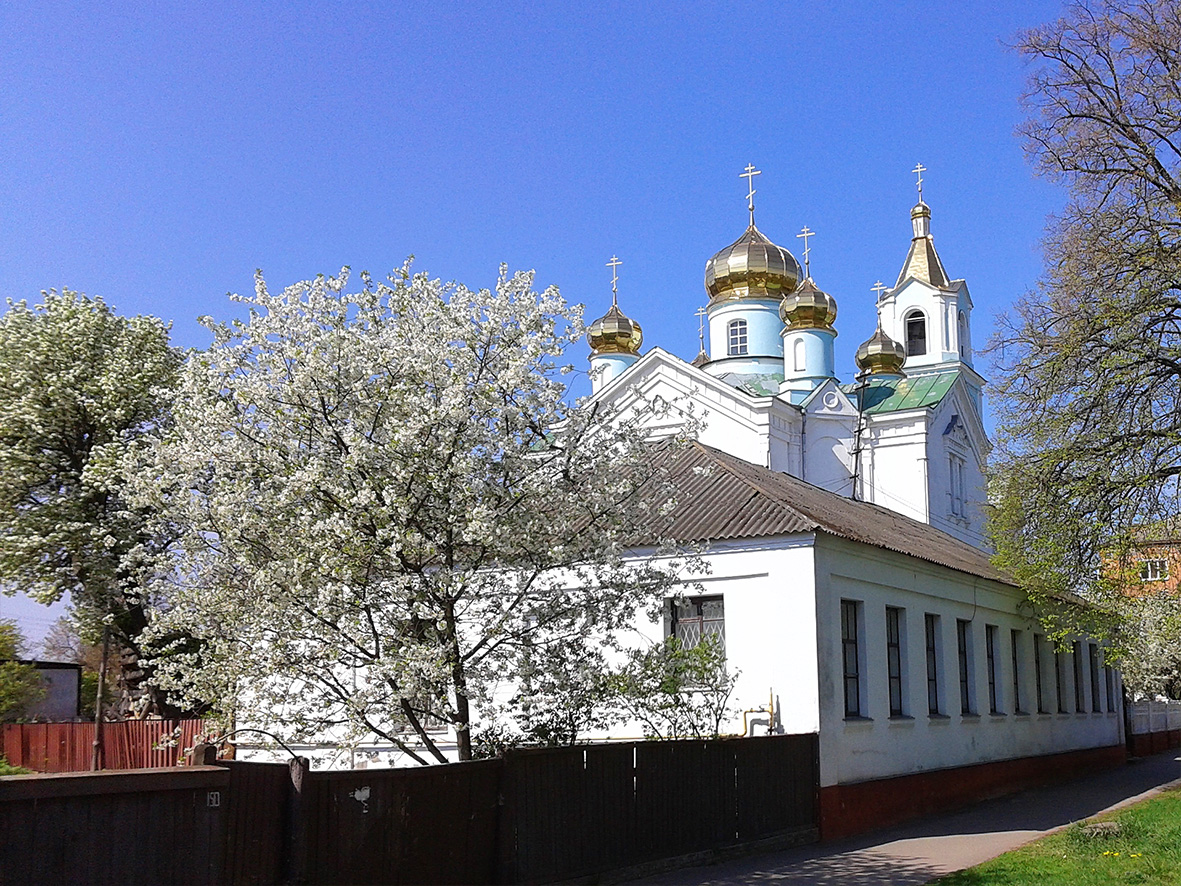
Ivanivska Church

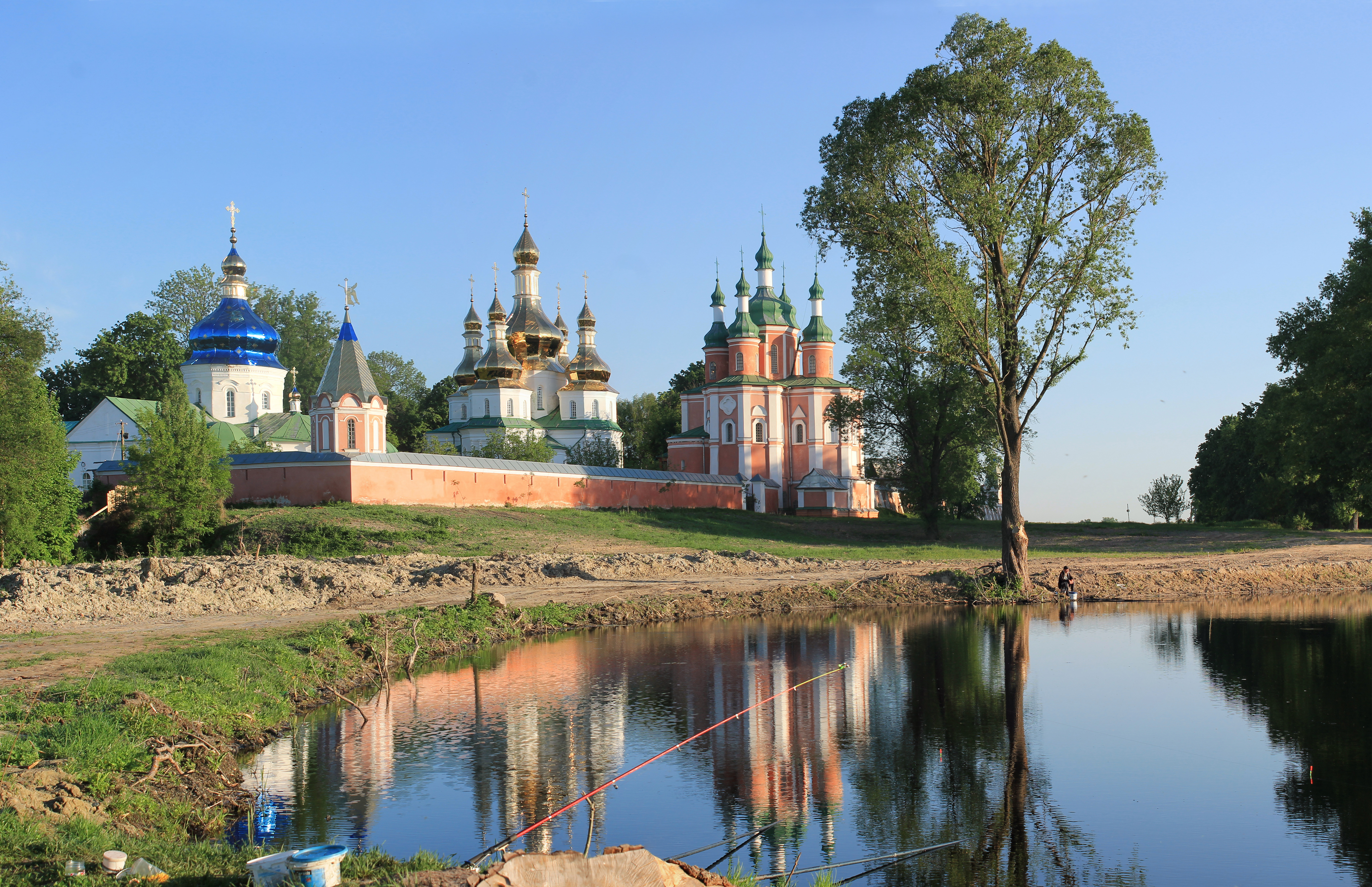
Hustynia Monastery

== International relations ==
=== Twin towns — sister cities ===
Pryluky is twinned with:

- Kościerzyna in Poland
- Ostrołęka in Poland.
