= Anatoly Morozov (scientist) =

Ukrainian cyberneticist

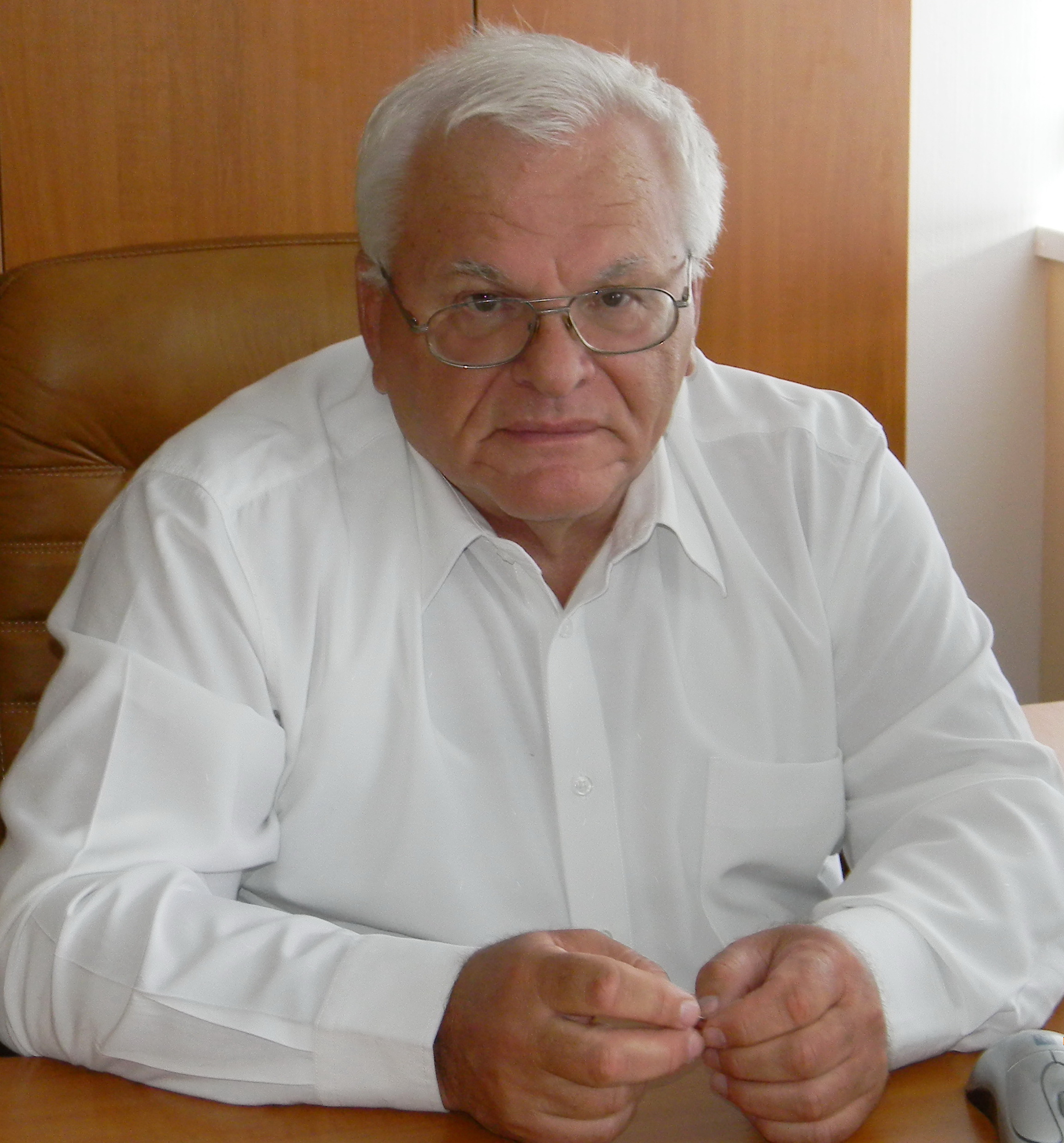
- Born: 9 May 1939 (age 87); Kiev, Ukrainian SSR, Soviet Union
- Education: Kyiv Polytechnic Institute
- Occupation: Scientist
- Known for: RADA system
- Awards: USSR State Prize

Anatoly Alekseevich Morozov (Russian: Анатолий Алексеевич Морозов, Ukrainian: Анатолій Олексійович Морозов; born 9 May 1939) is a Ukrainian scientist in the field of cybernetics. He is a Full Member of the National Academy of Sciences of Ukraine, a Full member (Academician) of the International Academy of Information Science and the Academy of Technological Sciences of Russia and the President of the Academy of Technological Sciences of Ukraine.

== Early life and education ==
Morozov was born in Kiev, in the Ukrainian SSR of the Soviet Union, in present-day Ukraine. He was educated at the Kyiv Polytechnic Institute and was a student and follower of Victor Glushkov. From 1961 to 1992 he worked at the Institute of Cybernetics, Kiev. Since then he is with the Institute of Mathematical Machines and Systems Problems.

== Notable works ==
Morozov was the chief designer of the automated control system of the Lviv manufacturing project, supervised by Glushkov. In 1970 Glushkov and the developers of Lviv were awarded the State Award of Ukrainian Socialist Republic.

Since May 1, 1986, Morozov has been involved in the liquidation of consequences resulting from the Chernobyl disaster. He worked directly in a failure-zone for the greater part of a year. He headed the Special Design Bureau of Mathematical Machines and Systems of the Institute Cybernetics Academy of Sciences, Ukrainian Soviet Socialist Republic and organized the Special Design Office of Experts of the Academy of Sciences of the Ukrainian Soviet Socialist Republic. These bodies organized the ministries and departments of the Ukrainian Soviet Socialist Republic concerning the situational forecasting of radiation pollution of the Dnipro River and the territory of Ukraine. For this work he was awarded the Order of the Red Banner of Labour.

Morozov is the Chief Designer of the RADA system, a hardware/software complex for the support of decisions by public authorities at various levels used by the Verkhovna Rada (Parliament of Ukraine). It is also used by various councils at different state levels in Ukraine and in several other countries. In 1998 he and the group of developers were awarded the State Award of Ukraine for this project.

== Honors and awards ==
He has many state awards and honours, including the following:

- Full Member, National Academy of Sciences of Ukraine
- USSR State Prize, three times
- State Prize of the Ukraine SSR, three times
- Order of the Red Banner of Labour
- Order of Merit, Third Class
