= State Nuclear Regulatory Inspectorate =

Nuclear Regulatory Inspectorate (Інспекція ядерного регулювання)
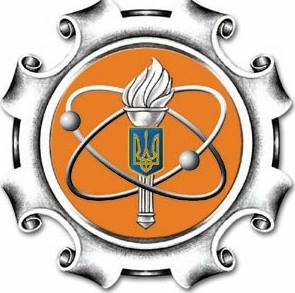

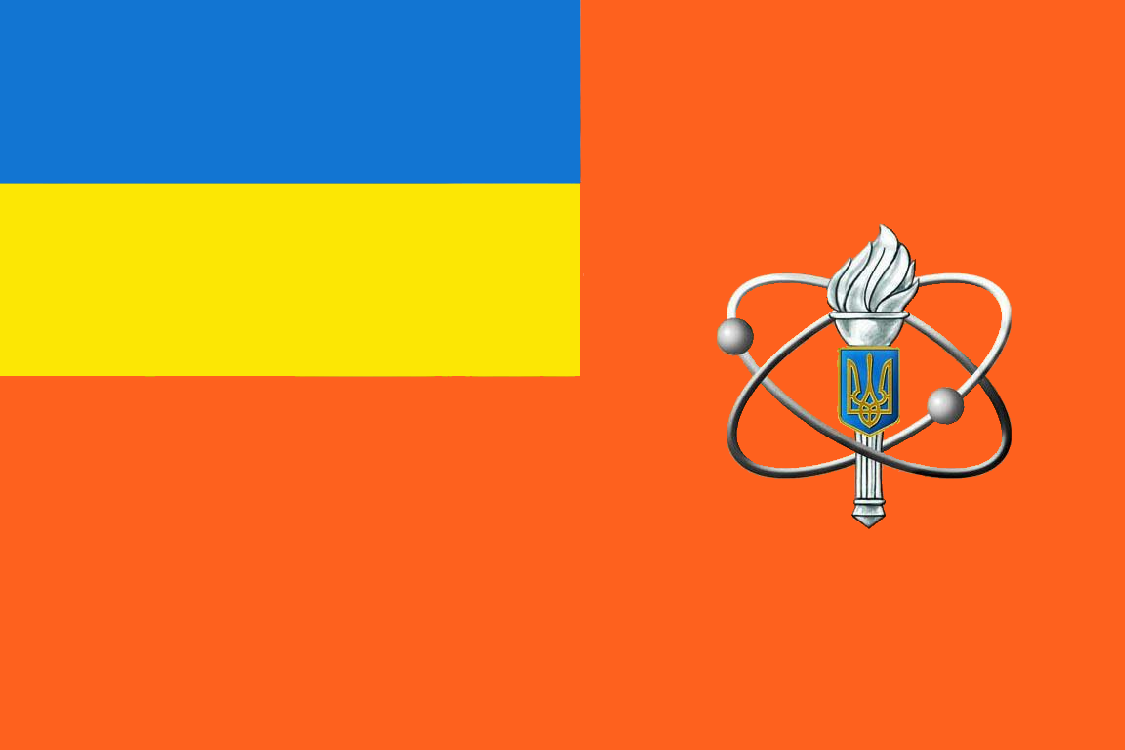

Agency overview
- Formed: 1993
- Preceding agency: State Nuclear Regulatory Committee of Ukraine (Регуляторний комітет)
- Jurisdiction: Ukraine
- Headquarters: 9/11, Arsenalna st, Kyiv
- Agency executive: Oleh Korikov
- Parent agency: Cabinet of Ministers; Constitution of Ukraine
- Website: Official website

State Nuclear Regulatory Inspectorate (SNRI, Ukrainian: Державна інспекція ядерного регулювання України) is the central government executive authority responsible for formation and implementation of state policy in the field of nuclear safety. Formerly known as State Nuclear Regulatory Committee of Ukraine.

== See also ==
- Ministry of Energy and Coal Mining
