= Academy of Technological Sciences of Ukraine =

Coordinates: 50.3623°N 30.4420°E

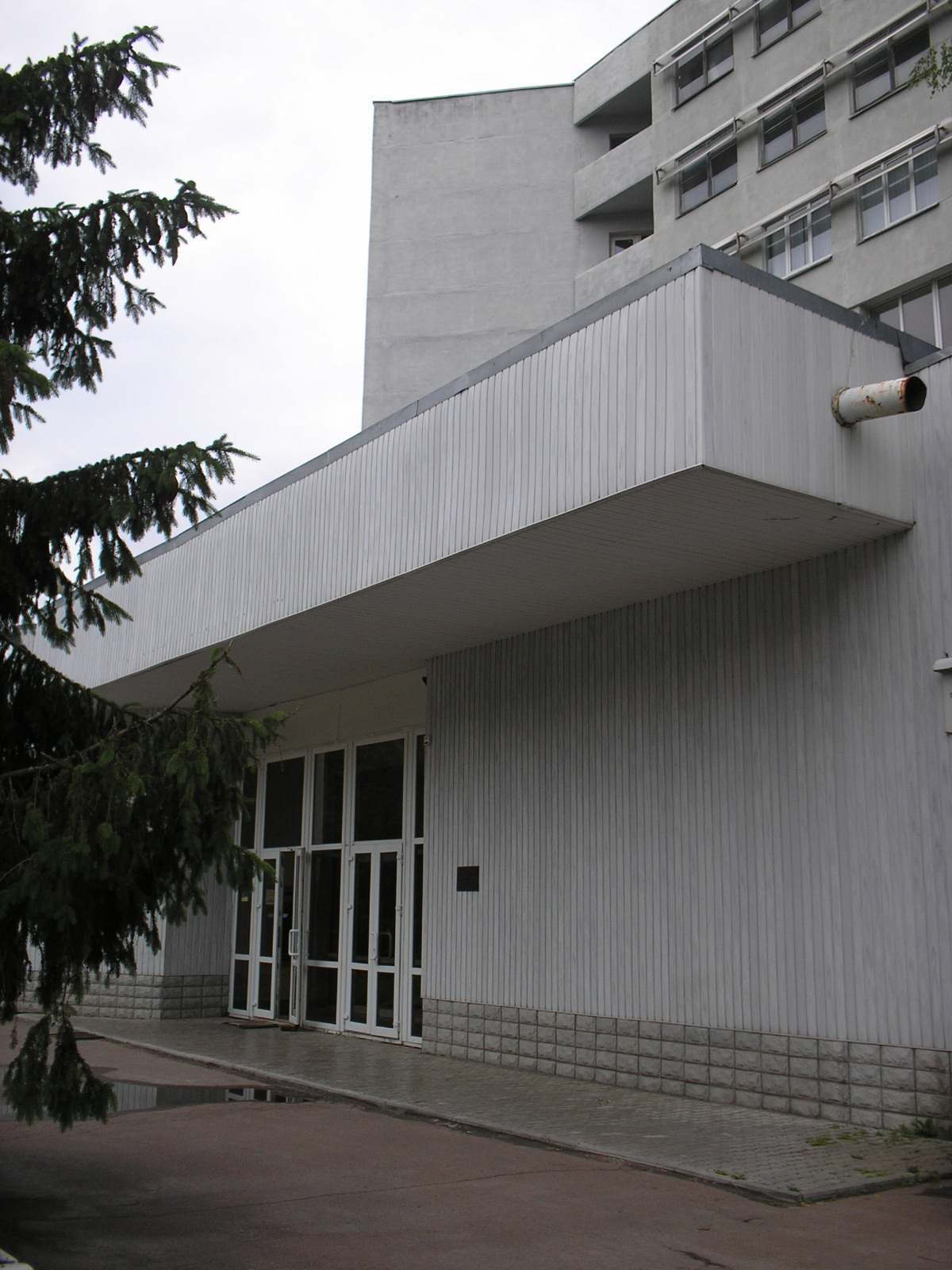
The Academy of Technological Sciences of Ukraine, Kiev

The Academy of Technological Sciences of Ukraine (ATS of Ukraine, ATSU) is a Ukrainian national academy, a public organization aiming at the consolidation of the intellectual and industrial-technological potential of applied scientists, technologists, and other experts in Ukraine.

== History ==
ATSU was founded in 1991 at the initiative of the Academy of Sciences of the Ukrainian Soviet Socialist Republic. The constituent assembly included a group of leading applied scientists and experts on technologies representing the scientific, industrial and military-industrial structure of Ukraine. The founding body included Ajzenberg J., Aleksandrov M. Gassanov L., Gerasimenko S., Gorbulin V., Dovgopoliy A., Kljuchnikov A., Konoplev I., Kornilov I., Krivulko V., Kuchma L., Matveev M., Morozov A., Pavlovskiy M., Parhomenko V., Petrov V., Piljushenko V., Ribinok V., Seminozhenko V., Skljarov V., Solovev Y., Tonkal V., Chujko A., Haber N and Shpak A.

== Members ==
The ATSU has two-tier membership: Acting (Full) Members (Academicians), and Corresponding Members. There is also an additional membership category for Foreign Members. There are currently 130 acting members (academicians), 125 correspondent members, two candidates for membership, and also 19 foreign acting members and seven foreign correspondent members from the US, Canada, Germany, Korea, Turkey, Russian Federation, Israel, Azerbaijan, Sweden, Italy, Netherlands, Poland and Uzbekistan. 179 of the members have Ph.D. degrees. Members include 88 professors, seven associate professors, and 12 correspondent members of the National Academy of Sciences of Ukraine (NASU).

== Organizational structure ==
The ATSU is led by a Praesidium and the Bureau of the Praesidium. There are ten sections dealing with the different fields of activity of the academy, namely:

- Information Technologies & Management of Technologies
- Technologies of Mechanical Engineering
- Technologies of Instrument-Making
- Nature Protection Technologies & Geotechnologies
- Social and Economic Management of Technologies, Preparation and Retraining of Experts
- Technologies of Food & Fodder Products
- Technologies in Building
- Technologies in Power
- High Technologies; and
- Special Technologies

The academy has four regional branches, in Kharkiv, Donetsk, Lviv and Crimean, and ten city branches. The academy also controls four R&D institutes, the Ukrainian Centre of Ecological & Water Projects, the Scientific Research Institute for Radiating Protection, the Institute for Bioiatrotechnics & Technologies and the Institute for Radar-Tracking Technologies. The academy was also the key founder of a number of other institutions, including the non-profit association Darnitsa − Centre of Investments, Innovations, and High Techs Promotion and others.

== Awards ==
The АТS of Ukraine awards the best scientists in the area of technologies "The Medal of Academician V.M. Glushkov". According to tradition, awarded person plant a tree in an avenue of sweet cherries.

== Notable members ==
The Academy of Technological Sciences of Ukraine has many known scientists. Among them is Anatoliy A. Morozov, the president of АТS of Ukraine, the developer of a program and hardware complex of the Parliament of Ukraine.
