= Georgians in France =

Total population
- 16,700

Regions with significant populations
- Paris (metropolitan area), Toulouse, Lyon, Marseille, Nice, Bordeaux, Saint-Étienne

Languages
- French and Georgian

Religion
- Georgian Orthodox Church

Related ethnic groups
- Georgians

There were fewer than 2,000 ethnic Georgians in France from 1922 to 1939 but around 10,000 (500 students, 2,000 asylum refugees and 8,000 legal residents) at the end of 2013. As of 2017 there were more than 14,500 Georgians in France.

== Notable people ==
=== People associated with the Democratic Republic of Georgia (1918–1921) ===
- Razhden Arsenidze (1880–1965), minister
- Nikolay Chkheidze (1864–1926), president of Parliament
- Akaki Chkhenkeli (1874–1959), minister
- Benia Chkhikvishvili (1881–1924), politician
- Kakutsa Cholokashvili (1888–1930), colonel
- Revaz Gabashvili (1882–1969), writer and politician
- Evgeni Gegechkori (1881–1954), minister
- Giorgi Gvazava (1869–1941), politician
- Valiko Jugheli (1887–1924), politician
- Noe Khomeriki (1883–1924), minister
- Giorgi Kvinitadze (1874–1970), military commander
- Vlasa Mgeladze (1868–1943), politician
- Samson Pirtskhalava (1872–1952), vice-president of Parliament
- Noe Ramishvili (1881–1930), president of Government
- Ekvtime Takaishvili (1863–1953), vice-president of Parliament
- Irakli Tsereteli (1881–1959), minister
- Mikheil Tsereteli (1878–1965), politician
- Grigol Uratadze (1880–1959), politician
- Noe Zhordania (1868–1953), president of Government

=== People born in Russia, Georgia or USSR ===
- Goudji Amachoukeli (1941–), goldsmith
- Dimitri Amilakhvari (1906–1942), colonel of French Army
- Constantin Andronikof (1916–1997), interpreter, translator and writer
- Géla Babluani (1979–), film director
- Djémal Bjalava (1944–), sculptor
- Ekaterine Dadiani (1816–1882), Princess
- Salome Dadiani (1848–1913), Princess
- Mary Eristavi (1888–1968), Princess
- Thorniké Gordadzé (1975–), political scientist
- Mamuka Gorgodze (1984–), rugby player
- Otar Iosseliani (1934–), film director
- Bidzina Ivanishvili (1956–), businessman and politician
- Alexandre Jioshvili (1975–), volleyball player
- Nino Kirtadzé (1968–), film director
- Jaba Kankava (1986–), football player
- Elie Mélia (1915–1988), priest
- Maria Meriko (1920–1994), actress
- Michel Mouskhely (1903–1964), political scientist and jurist
- Luka Mkheidze (1996–), judoka
- Victoria Ravva (1975–), volleyball player
- Viktor Sanikidze (1986–), basketball player
- Omar Tourmanaouli (1959–2019), writer and translator
- Giorgi Tsintsadze (1986–), basketball player
- Ilia Zedginidze (1977–), rugby player
- Levan Zourabichvili (1906–1975), president of Association géorgienne en France

=== People born in France ===
- Maryam d'Abo (1960–), actress
- Alex Abouladzé (1945–1978), poet
- Marie Amachoukeli (1979–), film director
- Ketevan Bagration of Mukhrani (1954–), ambassador of Georgia
- Gaston Bouatchidzé (1935–), writer and translator
- Hélène Carrère d'Encausse (1929–), permanent secretary of the Académie française,
- Florian Chakiachvili (1992–), ice hockey player,
- Georges Charachidzé (1930–2010), scholar of the Caucasian cultures,
- Serge Davri (1919–2012), actor
- Artchil Davrichachvili (1955–), priest
- Irakli Davrichewy (1940–), jazzman
- Kéthévane Davrichewy (1965–), writer
- Patricia Eligoulachvili (1958–), actress
- Raphaël Eligoulachvili, musician
- Guy Kédia (1934–2016), journalist
- Claude de Kemoularia (1922–2016), ambassador of France
- Luc Melua (1936–2010), motorist and journalist
- Mirian Melua, engineer and journalist
- Georges Mikautadze (2000–), football player for Metz and Georgia national football team
- Ethéry Pagava (1932–), prima ballerina
- Patrick Topaloff (1944–2010), comedian, singer and actor
- Dimitri Yachvili (1980–), rugby union footballer
- Grégoire Yachvili (1977–), rugby union footballer
- Michel Yachvili (1946–), rugby union footballer
- François Zourabichvili (1965–2006), philosopher
- Nicolas Zourabichvili (1936–), composer
- Salomé Zourabichvili (1952–), President of Georgia

== Religion ==
Saint Nino Georgian Orthodox Church, founded in 1929, in Paris, depends on Ecumenical Patriarcate of Constantinople through the Conference of Orthodox Bishops in France.

Saint Thamar Georgian Orthodox Church, founded in 2005, in Villeneuve-Saint-Georges (outside of Paris), depends on Georgian Orthodox Church.

== See also ==
- France–Georgia relations
- Georgian diaspora
- Immigration to France
- Georgian–French day of Leuville-sur-Orge
