= France–Georgia relations =

- France: Georgia

Diplomatic mission
- Embassy of France, Tbilisi: Embassy of Georgia, Paris

Envoy
- Ambassador Olivier Courteaud: Ambassador Irakli Kurashvili

France–Georgia relations are foreign relations between France and Georgia. Formal diplomatic relations between the two countries were first established in January 1921 but were soon interrupted by the Red Army invasion of Georgia. Relations were restored on August 21, 1992 following the collapse of the Soviet Union. Both nations are members of the Council of Europe. France is a member of the European Union, which Georgia applied for in 2022.

== Resident diplomatic mission ==
- France has an embassy in Tbilisi.
- Georgia has an embassy in Paris.
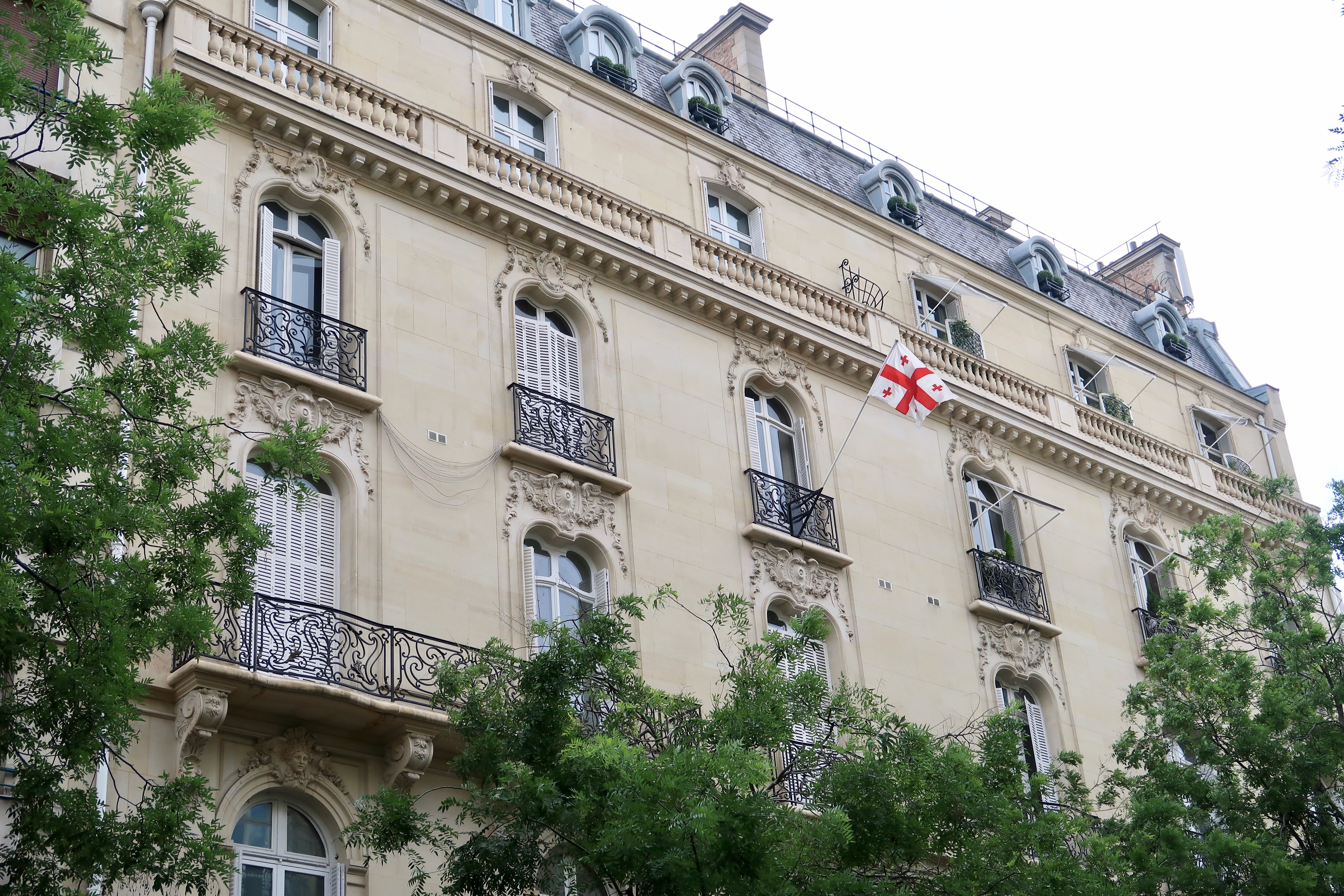
Embassy of Georgia in Paris

== See also ==
- Foreign relations of France
- Foreign relations of Georgia
- Georgian-French day of Leuville-sur-Orge
- Georgians in France
- List of ambassadors of France to Georgia
- List of ambassadors of Georgia to France
- Georgia-NATO relations
- Georgia-EU relations
  - Accession of Georgia to the EU
