= David Muskhelishvili =

Georgian historian

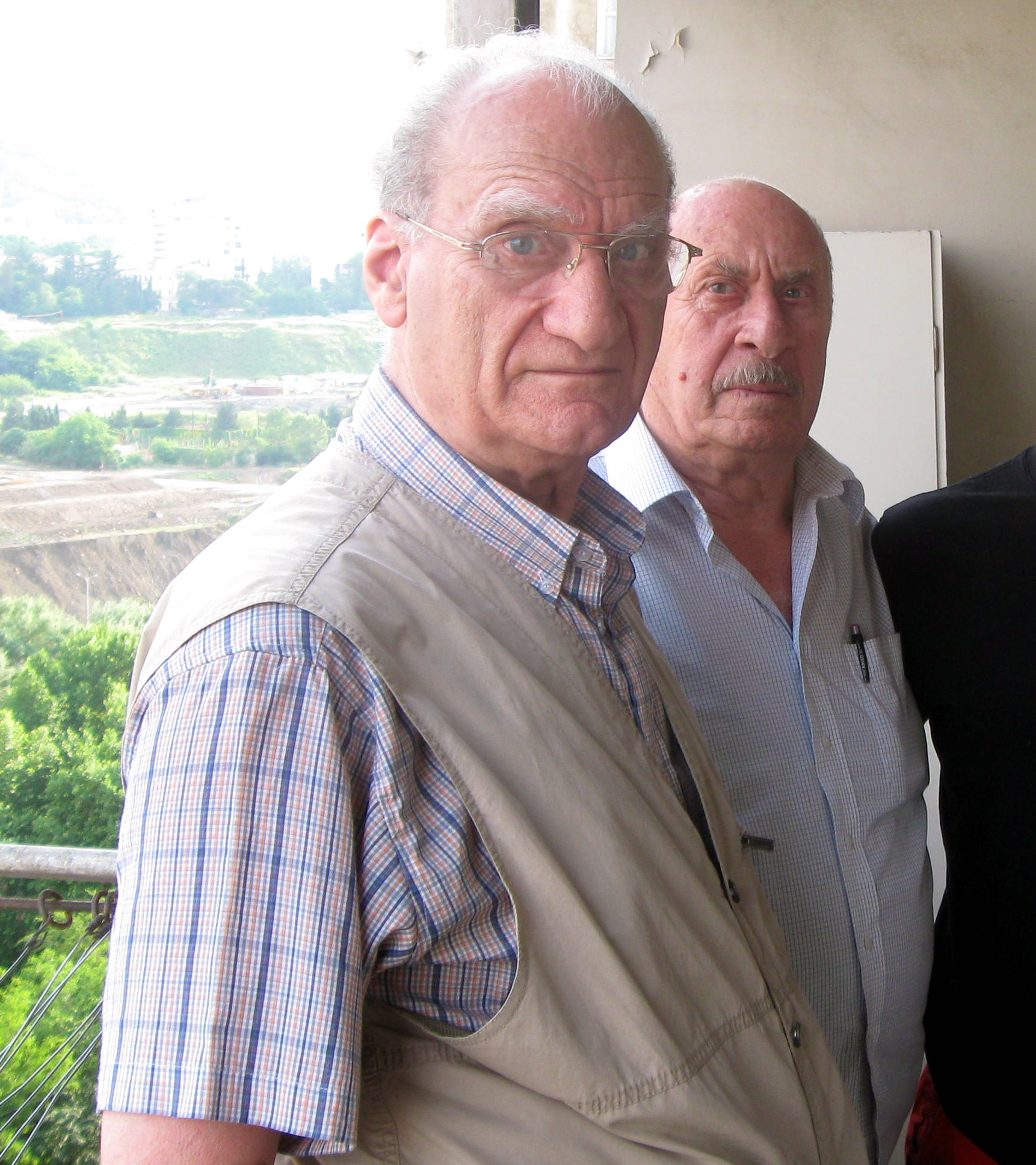
Dr. Muskhelishvili pictured on the left. Taken in Tbilisi, Georgia July 2010.

David Levan Muskhelishvili (born October 19, 1928 in Tbilisi, Georgia) is a member of the Georgian National Academy of Sciences.

== Education ==
An academic of Georgian history, David Muskhelishvili is the nephew of the late Georgian-French political scientist and jurist Michel Mouskhely. Educated at Tbilisi State University, earned his degree in History in 1952. In 1956 he became a doctoral candidate of Historical Sciences as be begun his work as a junior research worker at Ivane Javakhishvili Institute of History until 1960.

== Career ==
Then, from 1960 - 1967, David Muskhelishvili became a senior research worker at the same Institute. Through his rigorous work he was promoted to Head of the Department of History in 1967, all the while working on his Doctorate of Historical Sciences that he earned in 1973.

From 1972 - 1982 Dr. Muskhelishvili was the senior scientific editor of the Georgian-Soviet encyclopedia. In 1988 he became a Corresponding Member of the Academy, and it was in 1993 that Dr. Muskhelishvili became an Academician of the Georgian Academy of Sciences. In 1999 Dr. Muskhelishvili became the Director of the Historical Institute at Ivane Javakhishvili Institute, a position he held until 2006.

== Published works ==
With over 180 published works, here is the list of his principal scientific publications.

- The City-fortress Ujarma, Tbilisi, Metrsniereba, 1966
- The Basic Issues of the Historical Geography of Georgia, v. I, Tbilisi, 1977
- The Archaeological Material of the Former Settlement Site of Khovle
- The Basic Issues of the Historical Geography of Georgia, v. II, Tbilisi, 1980
- Из исторической географии Восточной Грузии, Тб., 1982
- The Old History of Kiziqi, Tbilisi, 1997
- Atlas of Georgian History (editor and coauthor)
- Georgia in the 4th-8th cent. Matiane, Tbilisi, 2003
- A Brief History of Georgia, Tbilisi, 2008
- Towards the periodization of Georgian History of the feudal period (4th- 10th cent.), Matsne, N 2, Tbilisi, 1980
- Analebi, N2, Tbilisi, 2004
- Zur ethnische Herkunft der Bevölkerung des Landes Daiaeni (Diaoxi. "Georgica"), 27, Aachen
- A Short Essay on the History of Georgia. Tbilisi, 2008
