= Melua =

Family name

Melua (/ˈmɛluːə/) is a family name originating in Georgia, specifically the Mingrelia region around the city of Zugdidi (Georgian: მელუა); it belongs to Orthodox Christian culture.

Samegrelo (Modern Georgia)

Usually Georgian etymologists consider that the surname came from the word melia (sometimes mela), meaning fox. Other surnames derived from the word melia are Meluava, Meliava, Meliva and Meladze. In French the surname is written Méloua.

== History ==
=== 19th century ===
Guria (Modern Georgia)

Groups with the surname Melua migrated from the Mingrelia region to the Guria region (around the town of Ozurgeti) to farm and breed horses, to Imereti (around the town of Kutaisi), and to Tbilisi.

=== 20th century ===
Some individuals bearing this name sought refuge abroad after the Red Army invaded the country.

- Mirian Melua (1903-1991), refugee in France
- Elie Melia (1915-1988), lived in Belgium and then in France; priest and historian of the Georgian Orthodox Church.
- Alexandre Meliava (1908-1968), refugee in France.

During the Soviet years, groups with the surname Melua migrated from Mingrelia, Guria and Tbilisi to Batum, Kiev, Moscow and Leningrad, for education and universities, but also for jobs.

After the return of Georgian sovereignty and the civil war, in 1991, a lot of people left the country and migrated; some with the surname Melua moved to Great Britain or to the United States, looking for a better life.

=== 21st century ===
Today, there are Georgian, American, British, French and Russian people with the surname Melua:

- Arkady Melua is the Russian general director and editor-in-chief of the scientific publishing house, Humanistica.
- David Melua is the executive secretary of National Association of Local Authorities of Georgia
- Elen Melua, was a former fashion collection chief, in Paris
- George Meluava is an American artist, painter
- Katie Melua is a Georgian-British singer
- Luc Méloua was a French motorist and journalist
- Mikheil Melua was a champion of Georgia in martial arts ("Goju-Ryu Karate")
- Mirian Melua, son, is chief editor of the newsletter Les Infos Brèves France Géorgie.
