= Salomé Zourabichvili =

5th president of Georgia

- სალომე ზურაბიშვილი
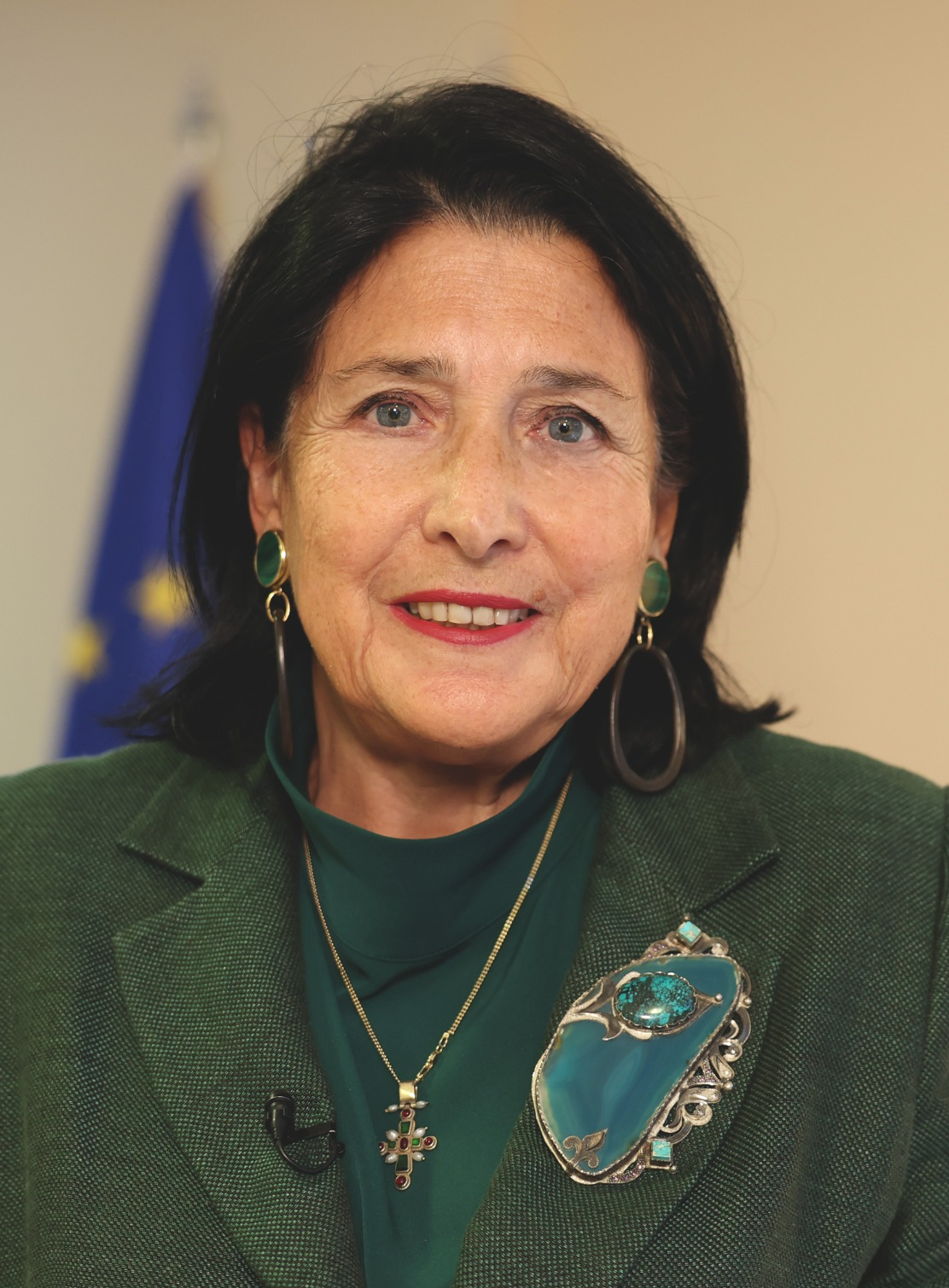
- Zourabichvili in 2024

5th President of Georgia
- In office 16 December 2018 – 29 December 2024 (Note: The presidency has been disputed between Zourabichvili and Mikheil Kavelashvili since 29 December 2024, with Zourabichvili, her supporters and significant parts of the international community asserting that she continues to be the legitimate president.)
- Prime Minister: Mamuka Bakhtadze; Giorgi Gakharia; Maya Tskitishvili (acting); Irakli Garibashvili; Irakli Kobakhidze
- Preceded by: Giorgi Margvelashvili
- Succeeded by: Mikheil Kavelashvili (disputed)

Minister of Foreign Affairs
- In office 20 March 2004 – 18 October 2005
- President: Mikheil Saakashvili
- Preceded by: Tedo Japaridze
- Succeeded by: Gela Bezhuashvili

Leader of The Way of Georgia
- In office 11 March 2006 – 12 November 2010
- Preceded by: Party established
- Succeeded by: Kakha Seturidze

Member of the Parliament of Georgia
- In office 18 November 2016 – 22 December 2018

Ambassador of France to Georgia
- In office 11 September 2003 – 20 March 2004
- President: Jacques Chirac
- Preceded by: Mireille Musso
- Succeeded by: Philippe Lefort

Personal details
- Born: 18 March 1952 (age 74) Paris, France
- Citizenship: French (1952–2018); Georgian (since 2004)
- Party: Independent (since 2011)
- Other political affiliations: Way of Georgia (2006–2011); Alliance for Georgia (2009–2010); Georgian Dream (2018)
- Spouses: Nicolas Gorjestani (m. 1981; div. 1992); Janri Kashia (m. 1993; died 2012)
- Children: 2
- Relatives: Niko Nikoladze (great-grandfather); Hélène Carrère d'Encausse (cousin); Nicolas Zourabichvili (cousin)
- Education: Sciences Po; Columbia University

Salomé Nino Zourabichvili (Note: Zourabichvili uses the French transliteration of her surname; the English transliteration is Zurabishvili.) (Note: Pronounced /ˌsɑːloʊˈmeɪ ˌzʊrəbɪʃˈviːli/ sa-loh-MAY zuur-ə-bish-VEEL-ee; French: Salomé Zourabichvili, pronounced [salɔme zuʁabiʃvili]; Georgian: სალომე ზურაბიშვილი, pronounced [saɫome zuɾabiʃʷili].) (born 18 March 1952) is a French-born Georgian politician and former diplomat who served as the fifth president of Georgia, becoming the first woman to be elected as president in the country's history. As a result of the constitutional amendments that came into effect in 2024, Zourabichvili became the last popularly elected president; under the new constitutional rules, Georgian presidents are to be elected indirectly by the Georgian Electoral Assembly.

Zourabichvili was born in Paris, France, into a family of Georgian political refugees. She joined the French diplomatic service in the 1970s and over three decades went on to occupy a variety of increasingly senior diplomatic positions. From 2003 to 2004, she served as the Ambassador of France to Georgia. In 2004, by mutual agreement between the presidents of France and Georgia, she accepted Georgian nationality and became the Foreign Minister of Georgia. During her tenure at the Georgian Ministry of Foreign Affairs (MFA), she negotiated a treaty that led to the withdrawal of Russian forces from the undisputed parts of the Georgian mainland.

Following disagreements with Georgia's then-ruling party United National Movement, in 2006 Zourabichvili launched her own political party, which she led until 2010. Ultimately, she was elected to the Georgian Parliament in 2016 as an independent. In 2018, Zourabichvili ran for president as an independent candidate and prevailed in a run-off vote against the UNM nominee Grigol Vashadze. During her presidential campaign, Zourabichvili was endorsed by the ruling Georgian Dream party; however, following the 2020–2021 Georgian political crisis, Zourabichvili became increasingly alienated from the GD-led Georgian government, a rift that worsened following the 2023 Georgian protests. As part of this inter-institutional conflict, the ruling party launched an impeachment proceeding against Zourabichvili in September 2023, but failed to gather sufficient votes to impeach her. Conflict with the ruling party has since developed into a political crisis in Georgia. When Mikheil Kavelashvili was elected as her successor, the validity of the election was contested, with Zourabichvili stating that she remains president until a legitimate replacement can be elected.

== Family and personal life ==
=== Ancestry ===
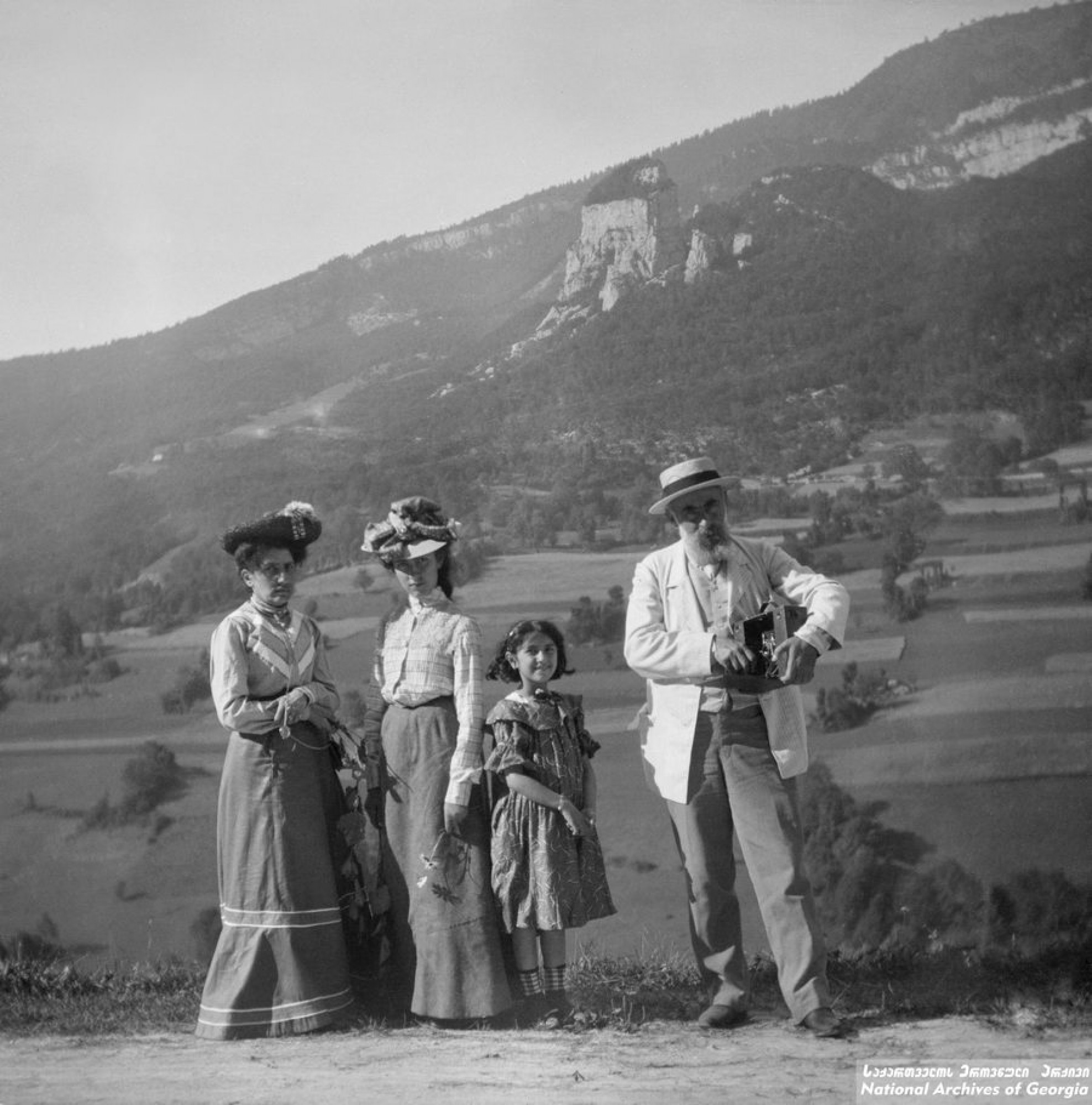
Niko Nikoladze and his family in 1902

Salome Zourabichvili was born into a family of Georgian emigrants that fled to France following the 1921 Red Army invasion of the Democratic Republic of Georgia. Her father, Levan Zourabichvili, a career engineer, served for many years as chairman of the Georgian Association of France (AGF). Levan is the maternal grandson of Niko Nikoladze (1843–1928), a businessman, philanthropist and Georgian politician of the late 19th century who served as a member of the Social-Democratic Party and was an influential leader of the Georgian liberal intelligentsia during the Russian Empire. Levan's brother, Georges Zourabichvili (1899-1944), was a philosopher and interpreter who was denounced for collaborating with the German occupiers in France and disappeared in 1944. Salome's mother, Zeïnab Kedia (1921–2016) was a daughter of Melkisedek Kedia, who served as the head of the Security Service of the Democratic Republic of Georgia, and the sister of Mikhail Kedia (1902–1954), a prominent member of the Wehrmacht's Georgian Legion during World War II.

Salome Zourabichvili has one brother, Othar Zourabichvili, a doctor, writer and chairman of the AGF since 2006. They are cousins of historian Hélène Carrère d'Encausse, who was a member of the Académie Française, and philosopher François Zourabichvili.

=== Youth ===
Salomé Zourabichvili was born in Paris on 18 March 1952 and was raised within the Georgian community in France, settled between Paris and Leuville-sur-Orge since the 1921 fall of the Democratic Republic of Georgia. Raised in a prominent emigrant family with close ties to the government-in-exile of Georgia, the diaspora was the only contact she had in her childhood with the country, once stating:

In the years before the Iron Curtain fell, there was no contact with Georgia–no letters, no newspapers, no visits. For us, it was a mythical country, which only existed in books.

At 8, she met her first visitor from Georgia during a visit to Paris by a Georgian ballet troupe, a meeting held in secret because of the repressive nature of the Soviet authorities organizing the visit. In an interview with The Washington Post, she said she felt comfortable "straddling the two cultures," attending French schools while going to the Georgian church of Paris on the weekends.

=== Higher education ===
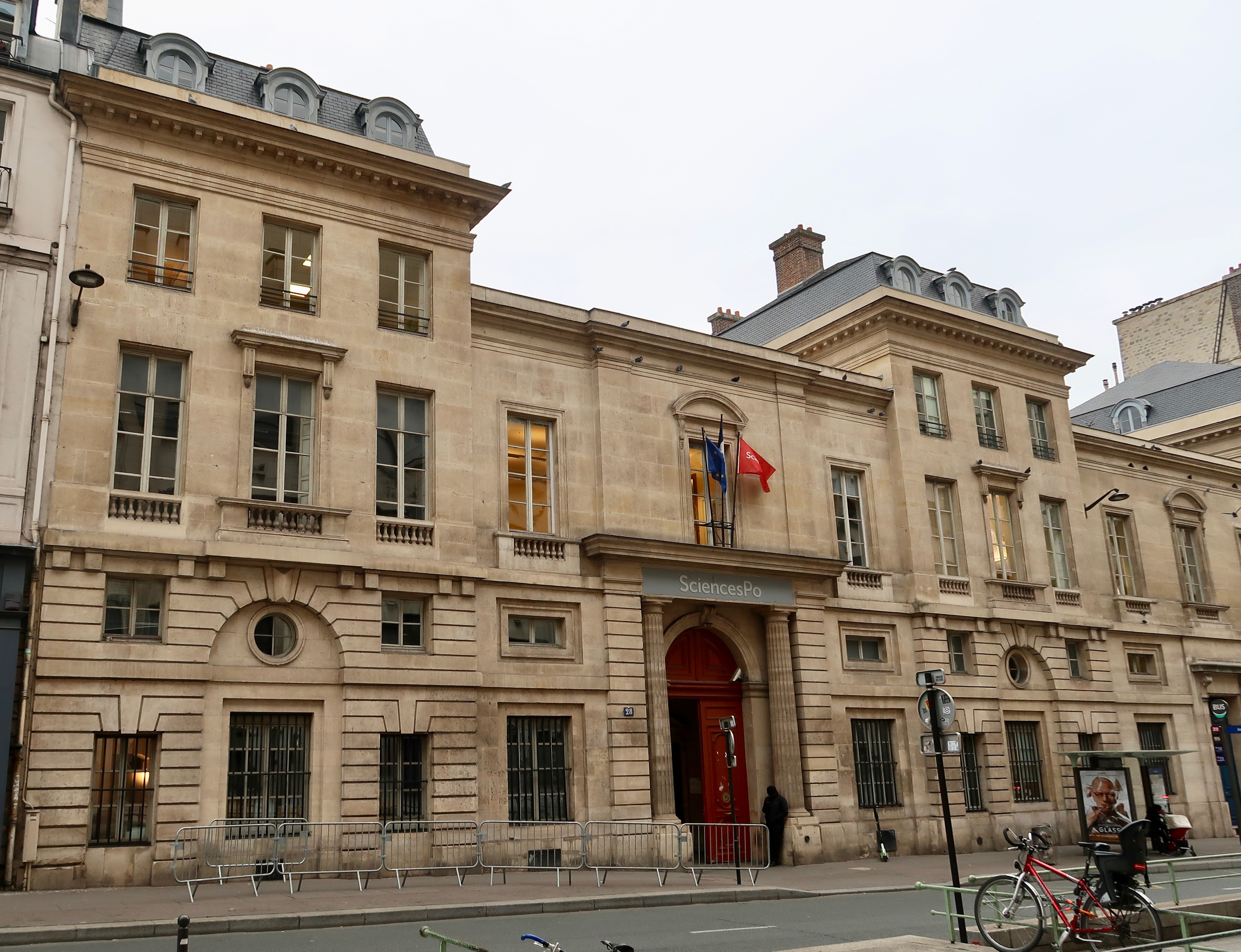
Sciences Po, where Zourabichvili studied from 1969 to 1972.

At 17, Zourabichvili received baccalauréat results that allowed her "the privilege of a direct admission in the terrible preparatory year" of the Paris Institute of Political Studies (Sciences Po) in September 1969, a program out of which only half of its participants reach the Institute after a year. In May 1970, her final exam topic choice on "Revolution and Counter-Revolution in Europe between 1917 and 1923" guaranteed her a spot at the Institute. Later in 2019, the school would describe her results on the topics on the Rerum novarum, Kulturkampf and Alexander II's reforms as a "triumph", while a professor described her as a "very smart student who quickly learned the methodology and know-how of the program".

In 1970, Zourabichvili joined the International Section of Sciences Po, a path toward diplomatic service accessed only by a minority of the 4,000 students at the Institute, of which a third were women. She studied under a number of well-known French professors, such as historians Jean-Baptiste Duroselle, Louis Chevalier, her cousin Hélène Carrère d'Encausse and the international lawyer Suzanne Bastid, the latter two being the only women teaching at Sciences Po. Zourabichvili concentrated her studies on the Soviet world and graduated in July 1972.

In a letter of recommendation by Sciences Po Secretary-General René Henry-Gréard, the latter described her as a student who, despite her "shyness", possessed "exceptional qualities" and predicted a great future for her. She joined Columbia University in 1972–1973 where Zbigniew Brzezinski, at the time director of the Trilateral Commission, trained her on Soviet politics and Cold War diplomacy.

Zourabichvili has said that choosing a career in diplomacy she linked with hopes to one day being instrumental in helping Georgia.

=== Teaching career ===
Zourabichvili returned to Sciences Po in 2006, this time as a professor shortly after her departure as Georgian Minister of Foreign Affairs. She worked until 2014 at the Paris School of International Affairs, teaching the foreign policy of large powers, the post-Soviet world, the development of Eurasia since the fall of the USSR, and the causes for that fall. In that post, she academically analyzed the progress of the European Union in times of crisis. A student would later describe her classes as "encouraging important debates".

=== Family and private life ===
From her first marriage to a World Bank economist Nicolas Gorjestani, Zourabichvili has two children: Kéthévane (journalist for France 24) and Teymouraz (a French diplomat). In 1993, she married her second husband Janri Kashia, a Georgian writer and journalist who was a political refugee in France. Kashia died in 2012.

Besides French and Georgian, Zourabichvili speaks fluent English and conversational Italian. She has a dog named Gombora.

== Career in France ==
=== Diplomatic beginnings ===
Zourabichvili joined the French diplomatic service in 1974. She quickly became a career diplomat, serving as Third Secretary in Rome until 1977, under ambassadors Charles Lucet and François Puaux, and then as Second Secretary at the Permanent Mission of France to the UN until 1980. Working with Jacques Leprette, she witnessed France's presidency of the United Nations Security Council in October 1978 and January 1980.

After a stint in Paris with the Policy Planning Staff at the French Ministry of Foreign Affairs, she returned to the U.S. in 1984 as First Secretary at the French Embassy in Washington, D.C., focusing on US-Soviet affairs under Ambassador Emmanuel de Margerie. She first visited Georgia in 1986. From 1988 to 1989, she served in Vienna as First Secretary to the French Mission to the Conference on Security and Co-operation in Europe, leading negotiations on conventional forces reduction.

From 1989 to 1992, she was Second Adviser at the French Embassy in Chad, during the period when Idriss Déby took power in a coup d'état supported by France.

=== Brussels and return to Paris ===
In 1992, Zourabichvili was appointed First Secretary to the Permanent Mission of France to NATO in Brussels, before becoming Deputy Permanent Representative of France to the Western European Union, still in Brussels, from 1993 to 1996.

In 1996 and 1997, she held the post of Technical Adviser at the Cabinet of the Ministry of Foreign Affairs in Paris. In 1997–1998, she was Inspector at the MFA, still in Paris, before she was appointed Under-Director of Strategic Affairs at the Management of Strategic Affairs, Security and Disarmament of the MFA, a post she left in 2001 to become director of International and Strategic Affairs at the General Secretariat of National Defense. She also worked with the Bureau of Strategic Affairs of NATO.

=== Ambassador to Georgia ===
Between 2003 and 2004, Zourabichvili was Ambassador Extraordinary and Plenipotentiary of France to Georgia.

== Georgian politics ==
=== Minister of Foreign Affairs ===
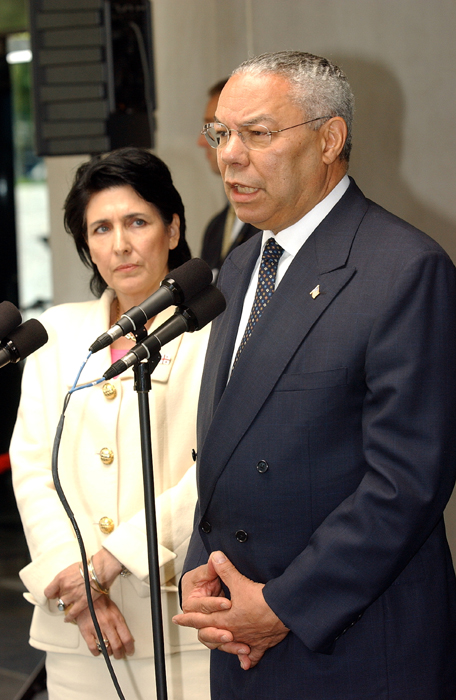
Zourabichvili with U.S. Secretary of State Colin Powell in 2004

President Mikheil Saakashvili of Georgia nominated Zourabichvili as Minister of Foreign Affairs, making her the first woman to hold this post in Georgia on 18 March 2004.

Zourabichvili served as the Coordinator of the Panel of Experts for the United Nations Security Council's Iran Sanctions Committee.

As Foreign Minister, she negotiated the withdrawal of Russian military bases from Georgia, signing an agreement with Russian Foreign Minister Sergey Lavrov on 19 May 2005. During her tenure, the "New Group of Friends of Georgia" was created, including Ukraine, Lithuania, Latvia, Estonia, Romania, Bulgaria, the Czech Republic, and Poland, to support Georgia's NATO aspirations and European integration.

Zourabichvili was dismissed by Prime Minister Zurab Nogaideli on 19 October 2005 after disputes with Parliament members. Criticized by several Georgian ambassadors, she resigned from the French foreign service and announced her intention to remain in Georgia to pursue a political career.

=== Political career ===
In November 2005, Zourabichvili set up the organization 'Salomé Zourabichvili's Movement'. In January 2006 she announced the establishment of a new political party The Way of Georgia, criticizing the country's "de facto one-party system." Although Zourabichvili enjoyed some degree of reputation in Georgia she was long unable to establish herself in the political field. At the city council elections in Tbilisi on 5 October 2006, only 2.77% of the constituency voted for her party. Six months before, an opinion poll conducted by the Georgian weekly Kviris Palitra suggested that she would garner 23.1% of the votes at presidential elections. Since October 2007, her party was part of the United Opposition alliance, which nominated Zourabichvili as a Prospective Prime Minister in case of their candidate Levan Gachechiladze's victory in the January 2008 presidential election.

As part of a 2009 campaign of the Georgian opposition to force President Mikheil Saakashvili to resign, Zourabichvili led a protest march together with three other prominent opposition figures – Nino Burjanadze, David Gamkrelidze and Eka Beselia – in Tbilisi on 26 March 2009. Zourabichvili had previously accused Saakashvili of democratic backsliding.

On 12 November 2010, Zourabichvili announced her withdrawal from the leadership of Georgia's Way. She was succeeded by Kakha Seturidze. After a two-year leave from politics, she publicly endorsed Georgian Dream ahead of the 2013 presidential elections. Shortly after, Georgia's Central Election Commission refused to register her as a presidential candidate due to her dual Georgian-French citizenship.

In the 8 October 2016 parliamentary elections Zourabichvili won a seat as an independent, representing the Mtatsminda district of Tbilisi. She became MP on 18 November. During her term as MP, she was Deputy chairwoman of the parliamentary committee on Diaspora and Caucasus Issues.

== 2018 presidential candidacy ==
On 20 April 2017, during a TV interview, Zourabichvili said that "nothing is out of the question" about her participation in the 2018 presidential elections. At a briefing in her backyard on 6 August 2018, she voiced her desire to run in the election. On 16 August 2018, she officially launched her presidential campaign from the house-museum of her ancestor Niko Nikoladze in the village of Didi Jikhaishi, Imereti region.

On 23 August 2018, two months before the elections, Zourabichvili relinquished her French citizenship, which she had to renounce to participate in the presidential election. According to the Constitution of Georgia, dual citizens cannot hold the office of president, prime minister or Speaker of Parliament. On 9 September 2018, the Georgian Dream announced its support for Zourabichvili's independent candidacy for the presidential elections.

The presidential elections were held on 23 October 2018. Zourabichvili received 38.64% of the vote (615,572 votes) and secured a place in the second round of elections against the United Opposition candidate. The second round of the presidential election was held on 28 November. Zourabichvili received 59.52% of the vote (1,147,625 votes), defeating her opponent Grigol Vashadze, backed by the opposition, to become the first woman president in the History of Georgia.

== President of Georgia ==
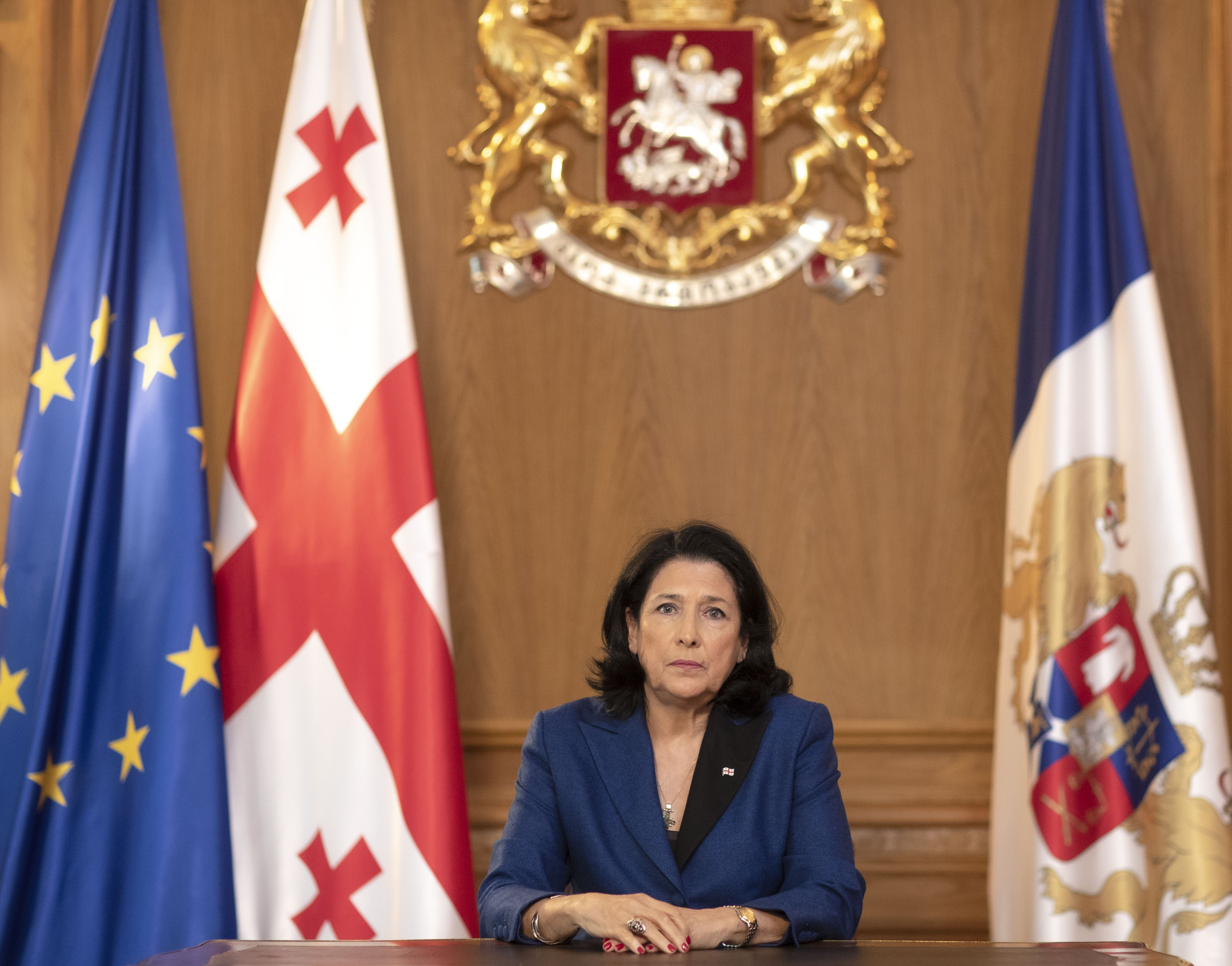
Zourabichvili addressing the nation on the anniversary of the April 9 tragedy.

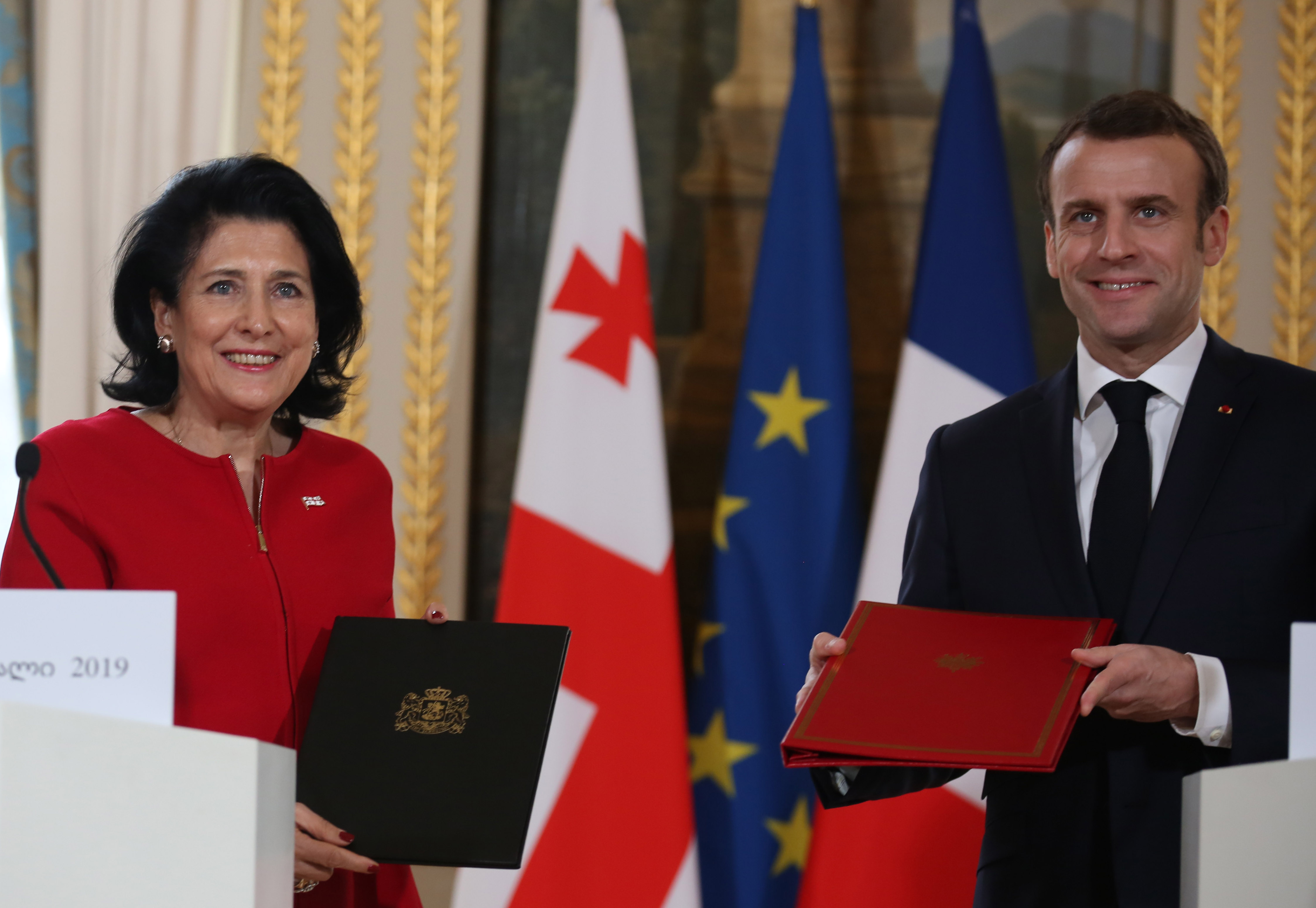
Zourabichvili with the French president Emmanuel Macron.

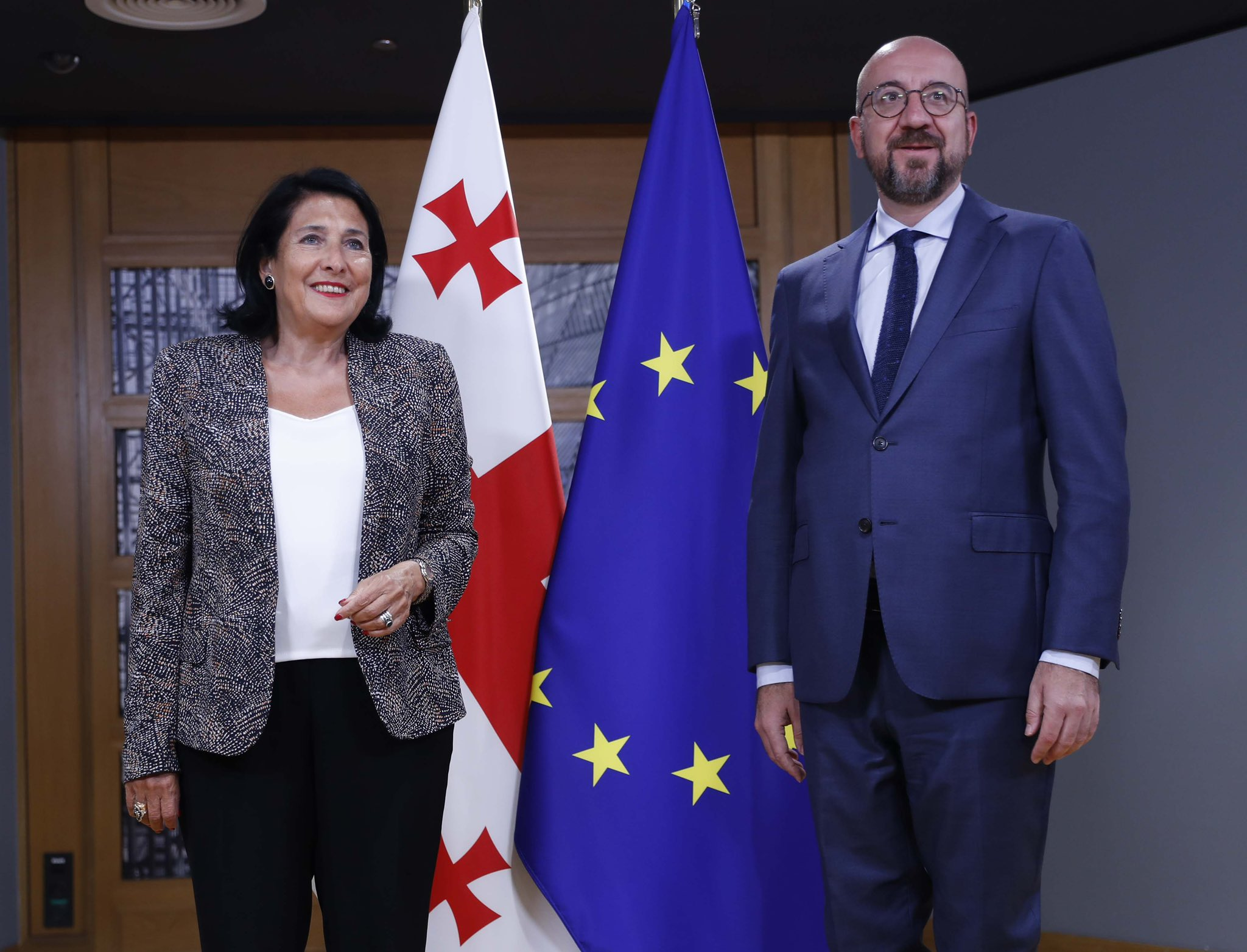
Zourabichvili with the President of the European Council Charles Michel.

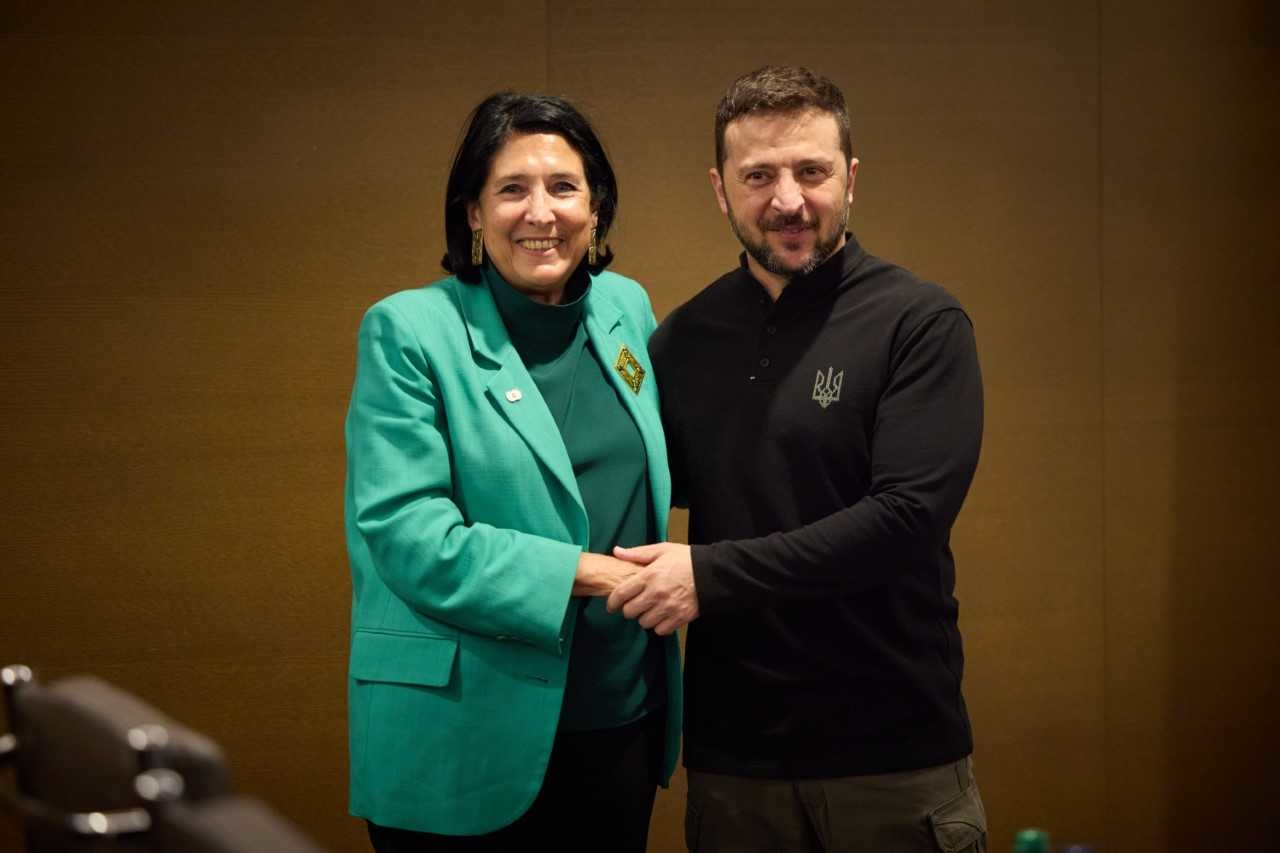
Zourabichvili with the Ukrainian president Volodymyr Zelenskyy.

=== Inauguration ===
On 16 December 2018, the inauguration of the 5th President of Georgia was held at the Erekle II Palace in Telavi. Zourabichvili wore a white and red ensemble, the colors of the Georgian flag, to the ceremony, designed by Jaba Diasamidze, a Georgian designer working in France. The president-elect was taken to the palace by car, and her children – Teimuraz and Ketevan Gorjestani – drove her to the red carpet.

The event was attended by a total of 1800 guests. According to the decision of the organizers, all guests, except those with health problems, stood on their feet. Among those present at the inauguration were the 4th President of Georgia Giorgi Margvelashvili and his wife, the Catholicos-Patriarch of All Georgia, Ilia II, the president of Armenia, Armen Sarkissian, the former president of France, Nicolas Sarkozy and representatives of other delegations.

As president, Zourabichvili inherited a new Constitution that entered into force the day of her inauguration and which significantly removed several powers from the Presidency, concentrating them within Parliament and the Prime Minister's Office. However, this did not stop her from using her position to call for historically-important decisions, including a new investigation into the controversial death of Zviad Gamsakhurdia, the country's first president, in 1993.

=== Domestic policy ===
Zourabichvili's first annual report as President was presented to the 9th convocation of Parliament on 6 March 2019. The European Georgia faction did not attend the president's speech. In her speech, Zourabichvili focused on her visits abroad.

On 20 April 2021, Zourabichvili hosted an official dinner in honor of the President of the European Council, Charles Michel. Representatives of the ruling team, as well as the opposition parties who signed the agreement brokered by Charles Michel, were present at the dinner at the Presidential Palace. The dinner was attended by the EU Ambassador to Georgia Carl Hartzell and the US Ambassador Kelly Degnan. By signing the document of Charles Michel, the representatives of the opposition and the government made political concessions.

=== COVID-19 pandemic ===
On 10 March 2020, President Zourabichvili canceled scheduled visits to Bulgaria, Belgium, and Ukraine due to the COVID-19 threat. On 21 March that year she declared a state of emergency in the country. The state of emergency was to last for a month, although on 21 April 2020, the president signed an extension until 21 May.

On 22 December 2020, Zourabichvili hosted Hans Kluge, Director of the WHO Regional Office for Europe, at the Orbeliani Palace. During the meeting, the health measures taken by Georgia during the pandemic and issues related to the COVID-19 vaccine were discussed. On 26 January 2021, Zourabichvili met with Toivo Klaar, Co-Chair of the Geneva International Talks, EU Special Representative for the South Caucasus and the Crisis in Georgia.

=== Foreign policy ===
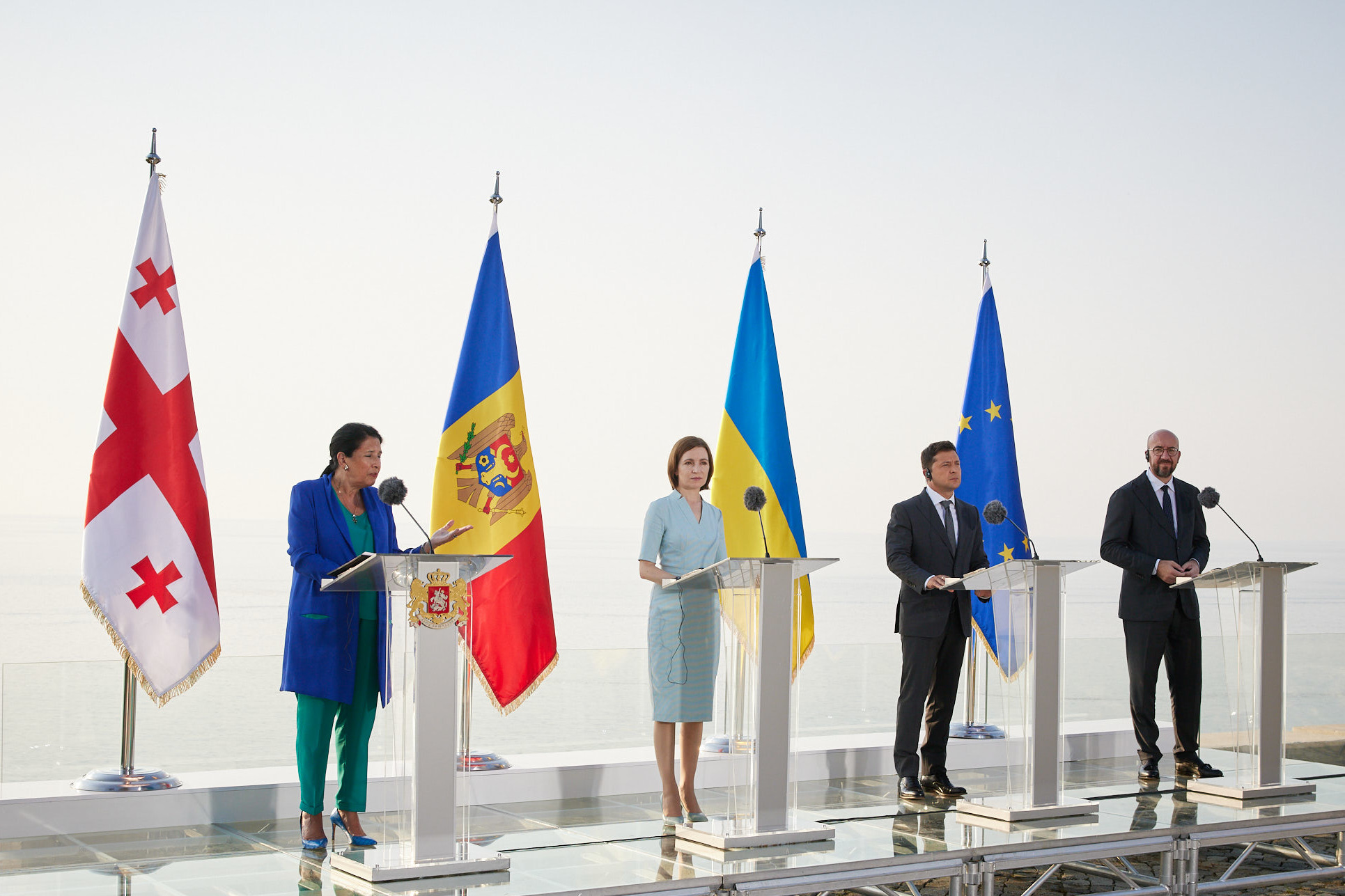
Salome Zourabichvili, Maia Sandu, Volodymyr Zelenskyy, and Charles Michel during the 2021 International Conference in Batumi.

As President of Georgia, Zourabichvili has visited many countries where she has represented her homeland and advocated for its interests, and met with foreign leaders. On 25 September 2019, Zourabichvili addressed the 74th session of the UN General Assembly in New York. In her speech, she spoke about the occupation, the ongoing political processes in Georgia, healthcare and climate change.

In January 2020 she visited Belgium, and in February she visited France and Afghanistan. She has also visited the leaders of Ukraine, Armenia, Germany, Poland, Latvia, Azerbaijan and many other countries.

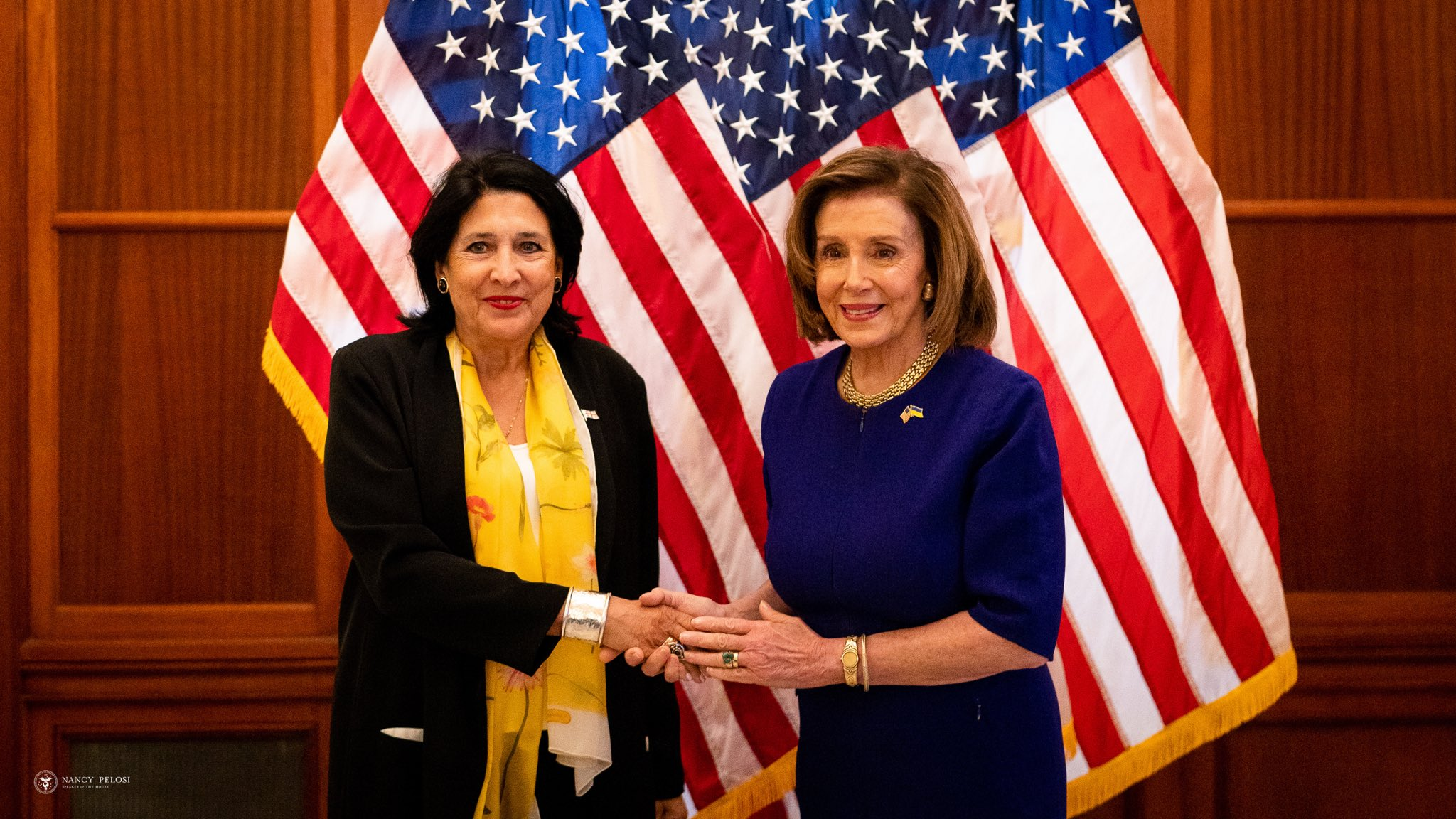
Zourabichvili with Nancy Pelosi

Popular opinion in Georgia hardened against Russia in the wake of the February 2022 Russian invasion of Ukraine, and on 3 March together with Moldova the country made a formal application to the EU for membership. The chairman of the Georgian Dream party Irakli Kobakhidze called for EU bodies to review application "in an emergency manner and to make the decision to grant Georgia the status of an EU membership candidate", while Zourabichvili said, "You can try to frighten countries but that doesn't mean you change their orientation, that you change their determination to keep their independence."

During an interview with DW News in May 2022, Zourabichvili stated that Georgia was in full compliance with the international financial sanctions on Russia and wanted a "quicker and shorter path towards integration" into NATO and the EU. She remarked that both France under Macron and Germany under Scholz had shifted their stance which ante-dated the August 2008 Russo-Georgian War and now embraced expansionary policies.

=== Residence and funding ===
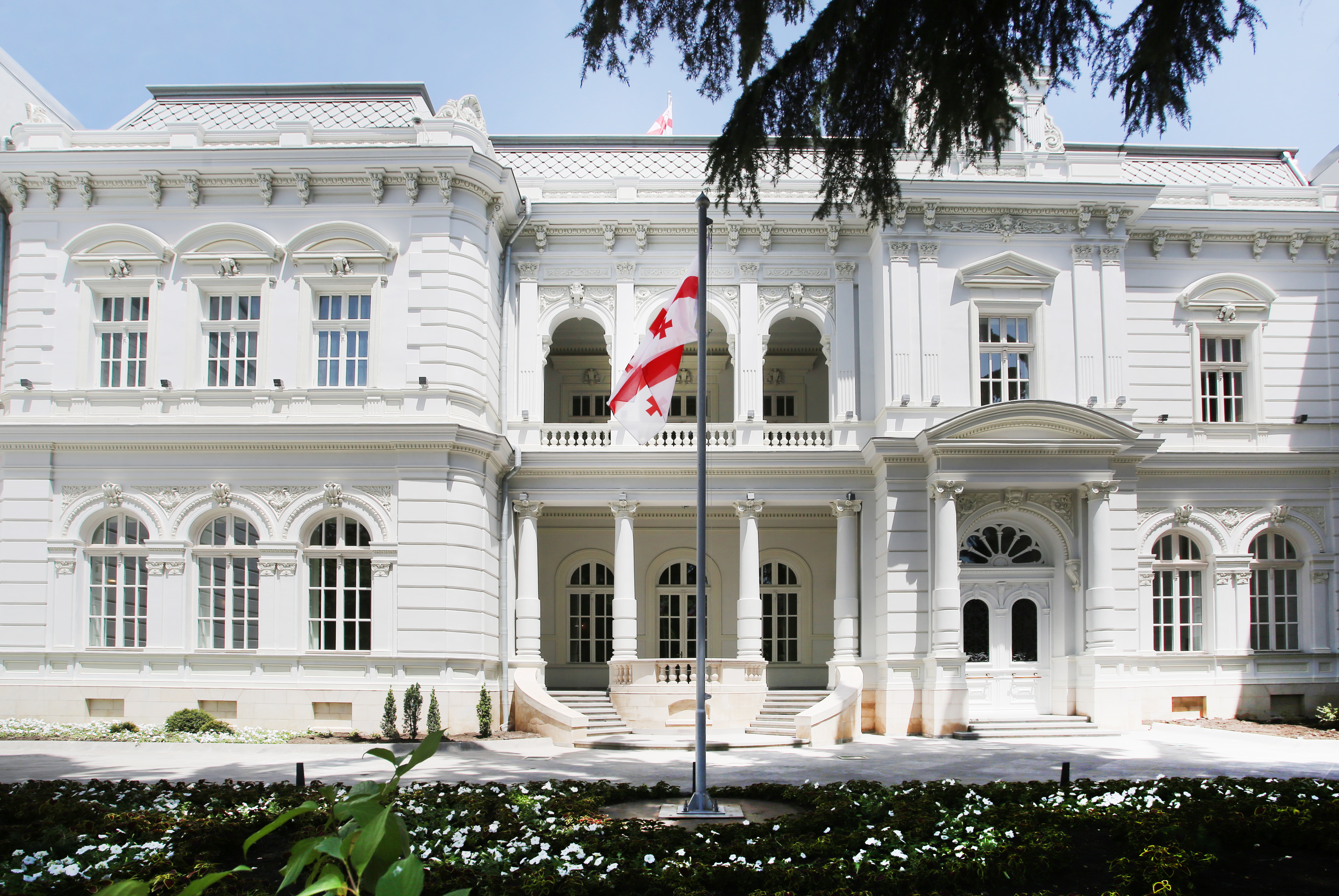
Orbeliani Palace is the official presidential residence in Tbilisi.

Zourabichvili announced during the presidential campaign that, if elected, she would not work from the Avlabari Presidential Palace, opened in 2009 during the Presidency of Mikheil Saakashvili. After her election, she met with the outgoing fourth President in the Avlabari Palace, but her administration moved into the Orbeliani Palace on Atoneli street in Central Tbilisi. On 18 December 2018 she visited the Atoneli residence for the first time. The media met her at the entrance, emphasizing the fact that she walked to the office.

Besides moving to the smaller residence, Zourabichvili's office faced significant budget cutbacks. According to the 2019 budget, funding for the presidential administration is being reduced by just over €3.5 million. As a result, the vast majority of former employees were fired with only 60 of them remaining in administration.

Changes have also led to abolishing the presidential fund which amounted to ₾5 million and funded scholarships, educational programs and various other projects. This decision was widely criticized, with former President Giorgi Margvelashvili and former First Lady Maka Chichua campaigning for the fund to be preserved.

=== Impeachment ===
Despite being endorsed by the ruling Georgian Dream party during the 2018 presidential election, Zourabichvili has become increasingly alienated from the governing party in the following years, which led to the President's inter-institutional conflict with the Second Garibashvili government and the Parliament. In at least two occasions, the Government banned the President from traveling abroad, preventing her from visiting Ukraine, Poland, Germany, and France. In March 2023, the Government announced it would file two lawsuits with the Constitutional Court against the President over her decision to go on an unauthorized visit to Brussels and Paris and over her refusal to sign outright decrees appointing ambassador candidates nominated by the Government, before dismissing the lawsuits several months later. Zourabichvili has increasingly used her veto power against the Parliament, as such, she has vetoed the bill changing the composition of Georgia's National Bank, the bill extending scope and time limits for covert investigations and other bills.

On 1 September 2023, the head of Georgian Dream party Irakli Kobakhidze announced that his party would launch impeachment proceedings against Zourabichvili, alleging violation of the Constitution on her behalf. Kobakhidze claimed that the President violated Article 52 Paragraph A of the Constitution of Georgia, which stipulates that the President of Georgia may exercise representative powers in foreign relations only with the consent of the Government. Against this, Zourabichvili launched a series of visits to Europe to meet the European leaders despite the government's refusal to authorize her visits. On 22 September, a petition signed by 80 parliamentary deputies to impeach President Zourabichvili was submitted to the Constitutional Court of Georgia. On 3 October, the Constitutional Court launched the impeachment hearing. On 16 October 2023, in the first impeachment trial against a President in Georgia's history, the Constitutional Court of Georgia ruled that Zourabichvili violated the Constitution, authorizing the Parliament to finalize her impeachment. On 18 October, the Parliament held a vote to impeach Zourabichvili but failed to collect 100 votes needed to impeach her with 86 votes in favor, 1 vote against, and 57 abstentions.

Ahead of 2024 parliamentary elections, Shalva Papuashvili, the speaker of parliament, announced that lawmakers from the Georgian Dream party planned to move forward with impeaching Zourabichvili for a second time. The charges were similar to those raised in a previous failed attempt, focusing on her unauthorized foreign visits. While Georgian Dream lacked the votes to impeach her, Papuashvili expressed hope that a new parliament could successfully pass the measure after the elections. Sozar Subari, leader of the Georgian Dream satellite party People's Power, told the media that impeachment should serve as a symbolic act when the president violates the Constitution. He argued that Zourabichvili should resign in disgrace, as, according to him, she no longer represents the Georgian people or the state. Zourabichvili has also warned that, if Georgian Dream secures another term, she could face impeachment and imprisonment.

=== Role in 2024 parliamentary elections ===
Following Russia's invasion of Ukraine in February 2022, Zourabichvili increasingly distanced herself from the ruling Georgian Dream party, which faced mounting criticism for its perceived pro-Russian policies. She has consistently opposed controversial domestic legislation targeting civil society, independent media, and the LGBTQ+ community, vetoing such laws despite her limited success in preventing their enactment. In 2023, the Georgian Dream-led government attempted to impeach Zourabichvili, accusing her of conducting “unilateral, unauthorized, and unconstitutional” visits to European capitals to advocate for Georgia's EU membership.

Zourabichvili sharply condemned the government during her 31 March 2023, state-of-the-nation address, accusing Georgian Dream of betraying its pro-European promises. She argued that the government, once committed to democracy and EU integration, had devolved into a one-party rule, with dissent suppressed and judicial reforms stalled. Zourabichvili also condemned the government's foreign policy shift, especially its growing proximity to Russia. She warned that Georgian Dream's attacks on European values and their attempts to spread conspiracy theories about the West, such as the notion of a "Global War Party" orchestrating global conflicts were deeply damaging to Georgia's future. Despite the mounting threats of impeachment and efforts to undermine her, Zourabichvili maintained her focus on EU integration, asserting that Georgia stood at a critical crossroads, similar to its struggle for independence.

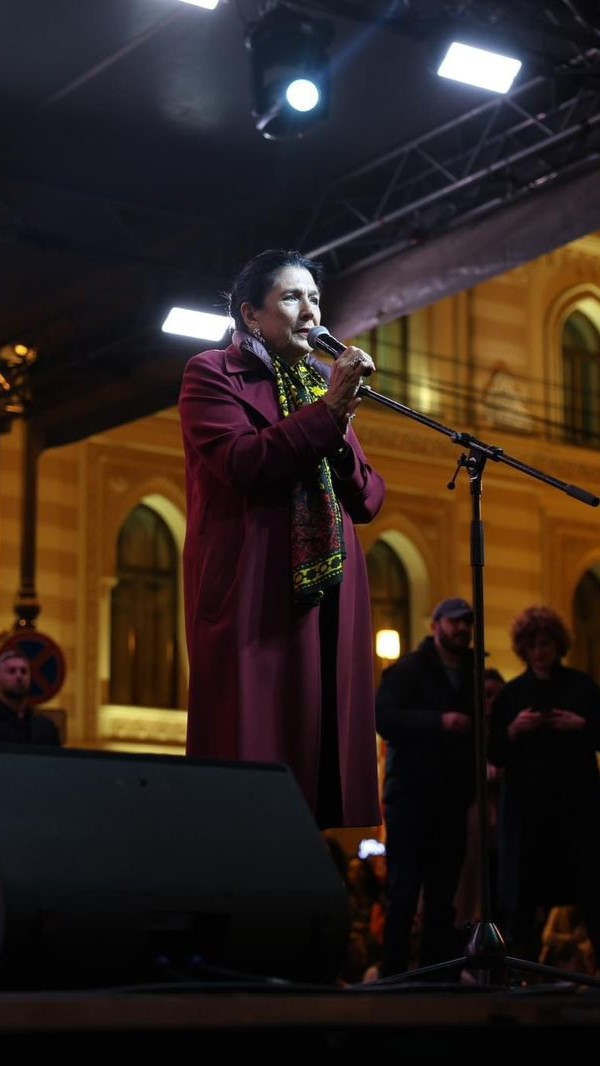
Zourabichvili addressing a pro-EU rally in Tbilisi, 20 October 2024.

In February 2022, Georgia had formally applied for EU membership. In December 2023, the European Union granted Georgia candidate status but emphasized the need for key policy reforms to progress further in the membership process.

In April 2024, Prime Minister Irakli Kobakhidze publicly denounced Zourabichvili as a "traitor" after she voiced support for mass protests opposing a controversial law. The legislation required civil society organizations and media outlets receiving 20% or more of their funding from foreign sources to register as “organizations serving the interest of a foreign power.” Critics, dubbing it the “Russian law” due to its similarities to Russian legislation, argued it undermined Georgia's EU aspirations and reflected a worrying shift toward Moscow's influence.

Although Zourabichvili vetoed the law, the Georgian Dream parliamentary majority overturned her veto, and the law took effect on 1 August 2024.

In response to these developments, Zourabichvili presented herself as an advocate for Georgia's democratic values and EU integration. In May 2024, she played a key role in facilitating the signing of the Georgian Charter, a political document uniting opposition groups in their commitment to support an interim government following the October parliamentary elections. This proposed government prioritized advancing reforms necessary for EU membership and repealing the controversial law.

On 12 October, Zourabichvili announced her plan to present a technical government before the parliamentary elections and urged the four main opposition alliances (Unity, Coalition For Change, Strong Georgia, For Georgia) to confirm their commitment to the Georgian Charter. She emphasized the Charter as an action plan to ensure Georgia's EU integration, prevent a return to Russian influence, and secure the country's progress. Zourabichvili stated she had met with European leaders who pledged support for Georgia's EU path if the Charter was fully implemented. While noting broad support among political forces, she highlighted differing interpretations of a Charter point requiring her to propose the government responsible for its implementation. She stressed the need for a neutral, technical government during this transitional stage and called on all parties to demonstrate their commitment to the Charter in both spirit and action.

She also advocated for greater unity between pro-European opposition forces, focusing on merging Strong Georgia coalition with For Georgia party. Zourabichvili emphasized that this coalition would serve as a “positive, third center” to provide clarity and direction for opposition-leaning, undecided voters. She facilitated discussions by inviting both leaders to the presidential residence. However, despite her efforts, the negotiations ultimately failed.

Zourabichvili's diplomatic efforts were bolstered by European leaders, who voiced support for Georgia's EU aspirations. On the anniversary of Russia's 2008 invasion of Georgia, U.S. President Joe Biden expressed solidarity with the people of Georgia and criticized the Georgian government's actions, which he deemed inconsistent with EU and NATO standards.

==== Protests in 2024 (28 October – present) ====
Following the 26 October 2024, parliamentary elections, Zourabichvili announced that she would not recognize the results. Georgian Dream was declared the winner by the country's electoral commission, securing a parliamentary majority. However, pro-EU parties disputed the results, with European election monitors reporting incidents of intimidation and irregularities during the election process.

During a press conference on 27 October 2024, Zourabichvili declared that the elections could not be recognized, equating recognition of the results to accepting Georgia's subordination to Russia. She emphasized that Georgia's European future could not be compromised and called the election results a “total falsification,” describing the process as a Russian special operation. Zourabichvili appealed to international allies to support the pro-Western opposition and urged citizens to join her in mass protests at Tbilisi's Freedom Square on Rustaveli Avenue to oppose the election results and what she characterized as Russian influence.

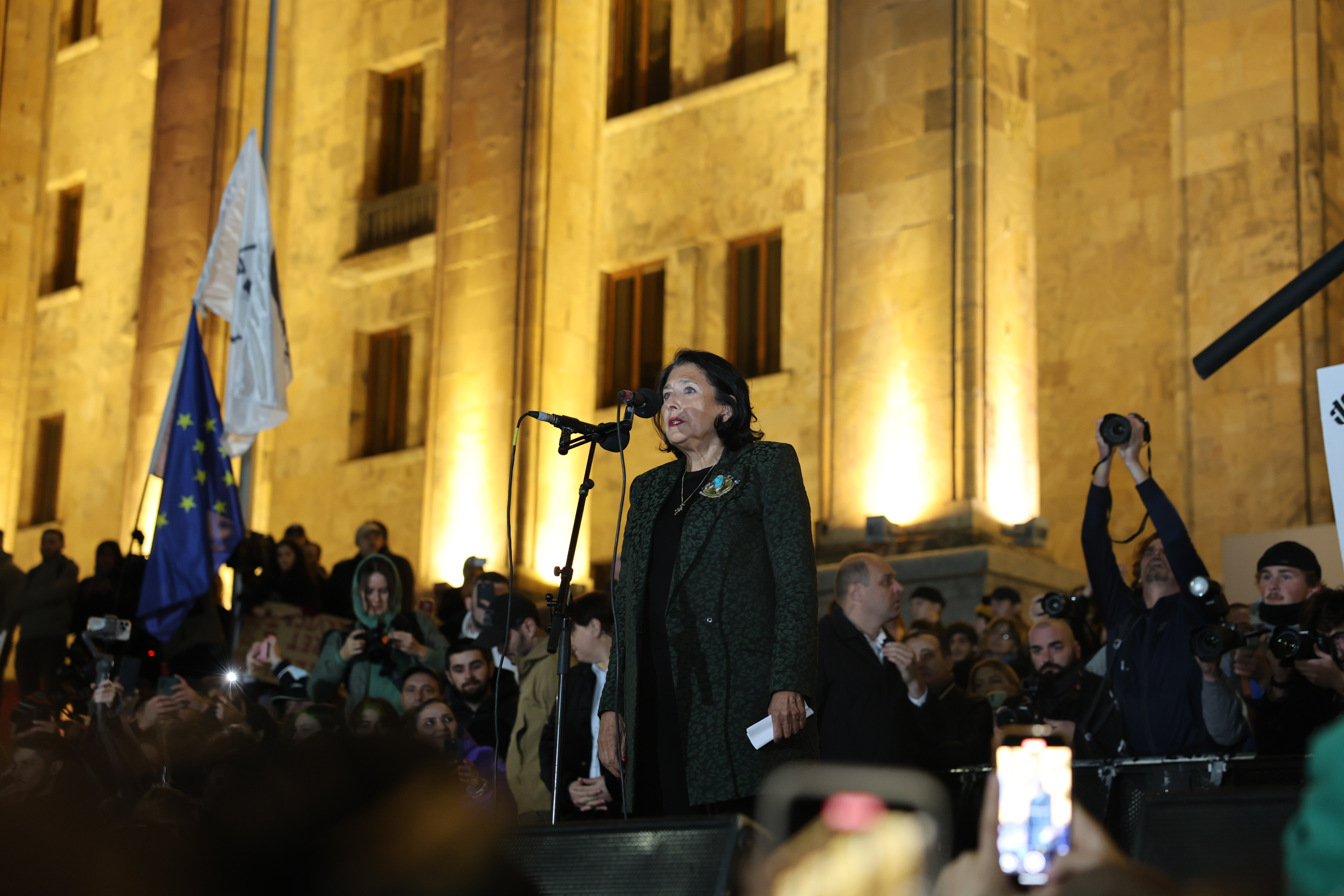
Salome Zourabichvili speaking at a post-election protest rally in front of the Georgian Parliament, 28 October 2024.

Following her accusations, the Georgian Prosecutor's Office launched an investigation and summoned Zourabichvili for questioning. She refused to cooperate, stating, “It's not the President's role to provide evidence already visible to the public.” Zourabichvili referenced reports and footage from NGOs, observers, and citizens, which she believed clearly demonstrated systemic election fraud.

On 18 November, Zourabichvili filed a lawsuit with the Constitutional Court, seeking to annul the results of the parliamentary election. A statement from her office declared the election results "unconstitutional," citing violations of the principles of universality and secrecy. She boycotted the opening of the new parliament on 25 November.

After the Georgian Dream government of Prime Minister Kobakhidze announced the suspension of Georgia's accession talks to the European Union until 2028, Zourabichvili called the new parliament "illegitimate" and supported protests against the suspension, adding that she would not step down as president upon the expiration of her term in December until new elections are held. Kobakhidze retaliated in response by affirming that "Zourabichvili will be forcefully removed if she does not comply with the results."

On 8 December, Salome Zourabichvili met with US President-elect Donald Trump and French President Emmanuel Macron in Paris. She shared details of the meeting on X, highlighting an "in-depth discussion" about the rigged election and the "alarming repression" in Georgia. Zourabichvili emphasized the need for a strong US and expressed gratitude for Trump's support, calling him a friend to the Georgian people. Zourabichvili also met with Elon Musk, who had been appointed by Trump to lead the new Department of Government Efficiency. She described the exchange as excellent and expressed anticipation for Musk's visit to Georgia. During her time in Paris, Zourabichvili also held discussions with Italian Prime Minister Giorgia Meloni and Ukrainian President Volodymyr Zelenskyy about the ongoing situation in Georgia.

On 27 December, U.S. Republican Congressman and Chairman of the Helsinki Commission, Joe Wilson, extended an invitation to Zourabichvili, recognizing her as the sole legitimate leader of Georgia, to attend the inauguration of Donald Trump. He wrote on X: "As the only legitimate leader in Georgia, I am grateful to extend an invite to President Salome Zourabichvili to attend the inauguration of President Donald Trump. I am in awe of her courage in the face of the assault by Ivanishvili and his friends in the CCP & Iranian regime."

=== Political crisis ===
Zourabichvili left the official presidential residence, Orbeliani Palace, on 29 December 2024, when Mikheil Kavelashvili was inaugurated. She said however that she remained the legitimate president. She was quoted saying "This building doesn't belong to anyone, this building was a symbol while the President, who was legitimate, sat here. I'm taking away the legitimacy, I'm taking away the flag, I'm taking away what is your trust".

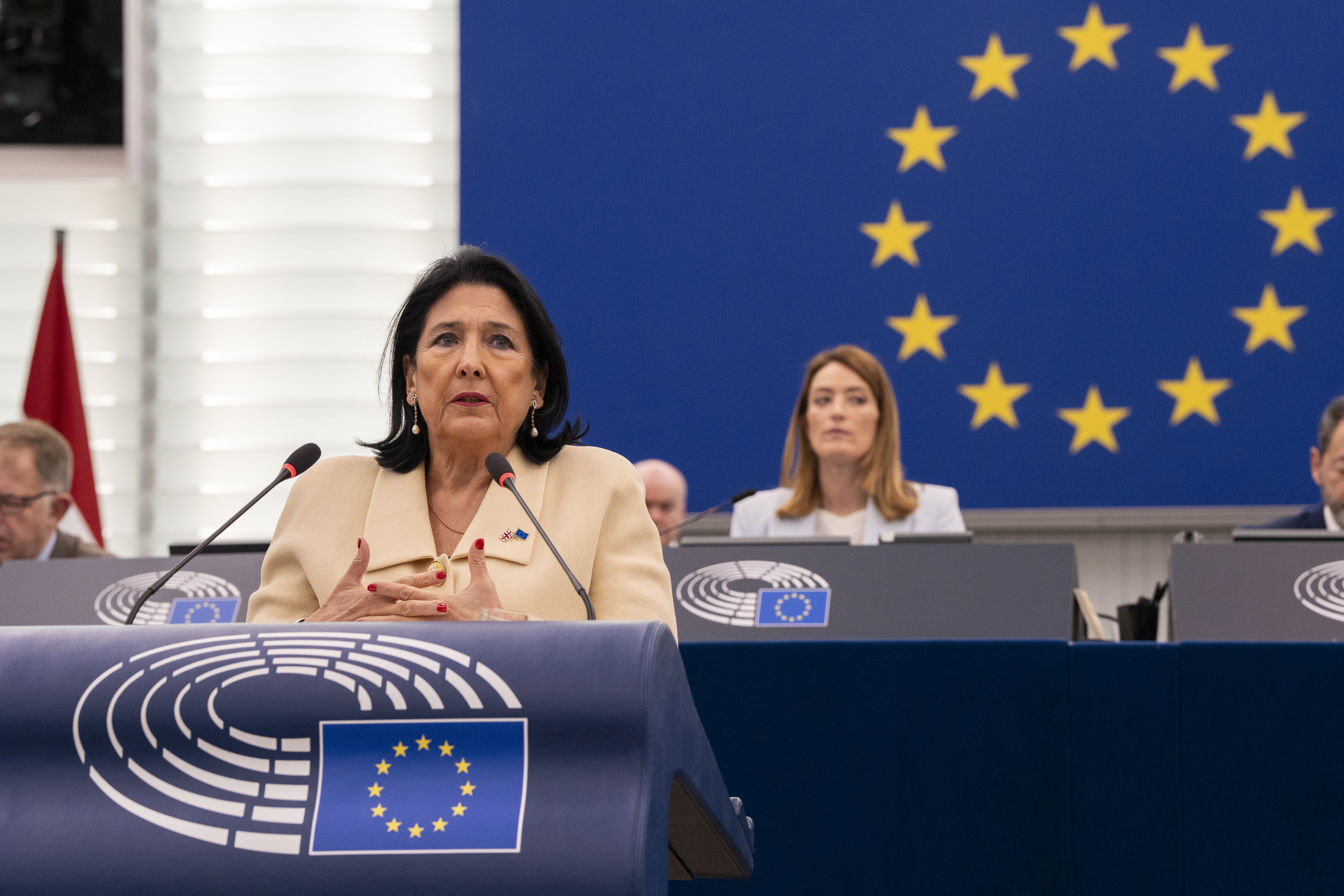
Zourabichvili addressing the European Parliament, 18 December 2024.

On 9 January 2025, Zourabichvili held a press briefing at her new office on Chovelidze street, stating that she would continue to work to solve the crisis, meeting people around Georgia and internationally. She stated that she would attend the inauguration of Donald Trump and hold high-level meetings in Washington. She described the Georgian state as being "practically on the verge of collapse", with state capture by a single party and single person. She stated that she remained president and would remain so until a new election can be held. On January 17, she arrived in Washington. The following day, she met with Trump's Secretary of State nominee Marco Rubio, Defense Secretary nominee Pete Hegseth, and Donald Trump Jr. as well as representatives of the International Republican Institute. In subsequent days, she also met with U.S. Senators Jeanne Shaheen and Roger Wicker. Following her meetings in Washington, Zourabichvili met with French President Emmanuel Macron. On 6 January 2025, the Washington, D.C.-based McCain Institute announced Zourabichvili as its 2025 Kissinger Fellow.

On 13 February, the European Parliament refused to recognize the self-proclaimed authorities of the ruling Georgian Dream party, including newly appointed Mikheil Kavelashvili, after the rigged 26 October elections. MEPs declared that Salome Zourabichvili continued to be Georgia's legitimate president and urged European Council President António Costa to invite her to represent Georgia in key EU meetings. They also called for sanctions on Georgian Dream officials responsible for electoral fraud, democratic backsliding, and human rights violations.

Zourabichvili attended the 61st Munich Security Conference from February 14 to 16, where she held meetings with high-ranking officials. She met with Estonian President Alar Karis, Latvian President Edgars Rinkēvičs, Moldovan President Maia Sandu, Council of Europe Secretary General Alain Berset, EU High Representative for Foreign Affairs and Security Policy Kaja Kallas, Helsinki Commission Co-Chair Joe Wilson, Ukrainian President Volodymyr Zelenskyy, Czech President Petr Pavel, Lithuanian President Gitanas Nausėda, Ukrainian Deputy Head of the Presidential Office Andrii Sybiha, French Minister Delegate for Europe Jean-Noël Barrot, and French politician Nathalie Loiseau.

On 18 February, Zourabichvili and Giorgi Gakharia were both attacked with eggs and verbally insulted at Tbilisi International Airport. Zourabichvili was returning from the Munich Security Conference when a group of individuals confronted her, shouting insults and throwing eggs. The incident was filmed and shared by Natia Beridze, an employee of the pro-government television channel "PosTV" who had earlier warned Zourabichvili on social media to "wear a raincoat" in anticipation of the attack. While Zourabichvili herself was not directly hit, members of her security team sustained injuries.

On 10 March, a private meeting took place between Zourabichvili and opposition politicians. In the meeting, according to Tamar Chergoleishvili, one of the leaders of the Federalists, Zourabichvili proposed the creation of a "common coordination front" to prepare for upcoming parliamentary elections and discussed plans to hold a protest rally on 31 March. Badri Japaridze, one of the leaders of Strong Georgia, argued for coordination among political parties and individuals active in the ongoing protests together with Zourabichvili.

== Political positions ==
=== Women's rights and equality ===
As the first popularly elected female president of Georgia, Zourabichvili has advocated for women's rights and equality through social media and from political tribunes. She has organized a number of meetings and attended conferences aiming for the empowerment of women and young girls. On 5 October 2019, she hosted a meeting of women leaders from Georgia, Belgium and France, later saying on Twitter: "The role of women in our society is crucial and their contribution to our political, cultural, entrepreneurial and educational circles is key to our development."

=== LGBTQ+ rights ===
Amid the controversy around the 2019 Tbilisi Pride Parade, Zourabichvili said: "I am everyone's president, regardless of sexual orientation or religious affiliation. No human should be discriminated against. I must also emphasize that our country is dealing with enough controversies and doesn't need any further provocation from any side of the LGBTQ debate." This comment was met with criticism by LGBTQ organizations across the country, as well as some members of the civil society. Tbilisi Pride co-founder Tamaz Sozashvili wrote: "How can she consider peaceful citizens and aggressive fundamentalists as equal sides?" She made no response to the criticism.

Following attacks on the offices of Tbilisi Pride by anti-LGBT protesters on 5 July 2021, in which a number of journalists, activists and passersby were injured, Zourabichvili condemned the violence and visited injured journalists in hospital. She subsequently tweeted: "Violence is unacceptable. I condemn today's events and any form of violence over difference of ideas or gender identity. Everyone has the constitutional right to express their opinion. I call on all to act within the Constitution and not provoke violence through radical actions."

In June 2022, Zourabichvili condemned the homophobic protest by far-right groups in front of the EU delegation offices in Tbilisi.

Zourabichvili refused to sign or veto the controversial "queer propaganda" law passed by parliament on 17 September 2024, which drew criticism from civil society and international partners for restricting rights and freedoms. The law, set to take effect after the 2024 parliamentary elections, was returned to parliament for the speaker's signature. Critics questioned why Zourabichvili did not veto the law, with some suggesting it was a strategic move to prevent Georgian Dream from using an extraordinary session to override her veto for political gain. Zourabichvili had called the law anti-European and anti-democratic, advocated for its repeal to align with EU recommendations, and attended the funeral of trans woman and media personality Kesaria Abramidze, who was murdered shortly after the law's passage.

=== Monarchy ===
In the course of the 2008 Georgian presidential election, Zourabichvili and many other opposition politicians voiced support for the establishment of a constitutional monarchy under the Bagrationi dynasty, which the Patriarch of Georgia, Ilia II, had advocated.

=== Foreign agent law ===
In 2023, a law draft was submitted by the parties of People's Power and Georgian Dream to the Parliament of Georgia. The law was ostensibly based on the U.S. Foreign Agents Registration Act of 1938, still in force, which, with the aim of exposing at the time Nazi propaganda, requires people to disclose when they lobby in the U.S. on behalf of foreign governments or foreign political entities. The bill, in draft form, would oblige all non-governmental organizations and media outlets to disclose the sources of their funding and, if they receive more than 20% of their funding from abroad, to register themselves as "agents of foreign influence". This caused massive unrest in the country, with protestors alleging that the law is a copy of a similar Russian law which is used to crack down on government critics. The draft was subsequently withdrawn.

Zourabichvili supported the protesters and said she would veto the bill if it came to that. The parliament withdrew the bill after protests.

After almost a year, on 14 May 2024, the draft was re-submitted and passed in the parliament with 84 votes in favor and 30 against. Zourabichvili promptly announced she was vetoing the bill. In doing so, she stated that the law "in its essence and spirit, is fundamentally Russian, contradicting our constitution and all European standards,” suggesting it could prevent Georgia from joining the European Union. The EU had already warned Georgia's parliament against passing the law. Two weeks later, on 28 May, the parliament, although the opposition boycotted the vote, by a vote of 84 to 4 overturned the presidential veto and irrevocably approved the legislation.

== Foreign honors ==
| Ribbon bar | Country/Entity | Honor |
|---|---|---|
| | France | Chevalière of the National Order of the Legion of Honour (2003) |
| | France | Officière of the Ordre national du Mérite |
| | Italy | Knight of the Order of the Star of Italian Solidarity (1978) |
| | Italy | Knight Grand Cross with Collar of the Order of Merit of the Italian Republic (2022) |
| | Greek Orthodox Patriarchate of Jerusalem | Great Cross of the Order of Orthodox Cross-Bearers of the Holy Sepulchre (2020) |
| | Cyprus | Grand Collar of the Order of Makarios III (2021) |
| | Moldova | Order of the Republic (2025) |
| | West University of Timișoara (Romania) | Doctor Honoris Causa in Nomine Libertatis (2026) |

== Works ==
- Une femme pour deux pays ["A Woman for Two Countries"] by Salome Zourabichvili (Édition Grasset, 2006) ISBN 978-2246695615
- საქართველოსკენ ["Toward Georgia"] by Salome Zourabichvili (Litera, 2005) ISBN 978-9941-21-321-2
- Les cicatrices des nations ["The Scar of Nations"] by Salome Zourabichvili (Édition François Bourin, 2008) ISBN 978-2849410752
- La tragédie géorgienne ["The Georgian Tragedy"] by Salome Zourabichvili (Édition Grasset, 2009) ISBN 978-2246753919
- L’exigence démocratique ["The Democratic Necessity"] by Salome Zourabichvili (Édition François Bourin, 2010) ISBN 978-2849412206

== Notes ==
Political offices
| Preceded by Tedo Japaridze | Minister of Foreign Affairs; 2004–2005 | Succeeded by Gela Bezhuashvili |
| Preceded by Giorgi Margvelashvili | President of Georgia; 2018–present | Incumbent |
