= Meluha =

Meluha may refer to:

- the land where the Shiva Trilogy of novel is set
  - The Immortals of Meluha, a book from the Shiva Trilogy
- Meluhha, a land described in ancient Sumerian texts

== See also ==
- Melua (surname), a Georgian surname
