= List of ambassadors of France to Georgia =

Ambassador of France To Georgia
- L'Ambassadeur (L'Ambassadrice) de France en Géorgie
- Arms of France

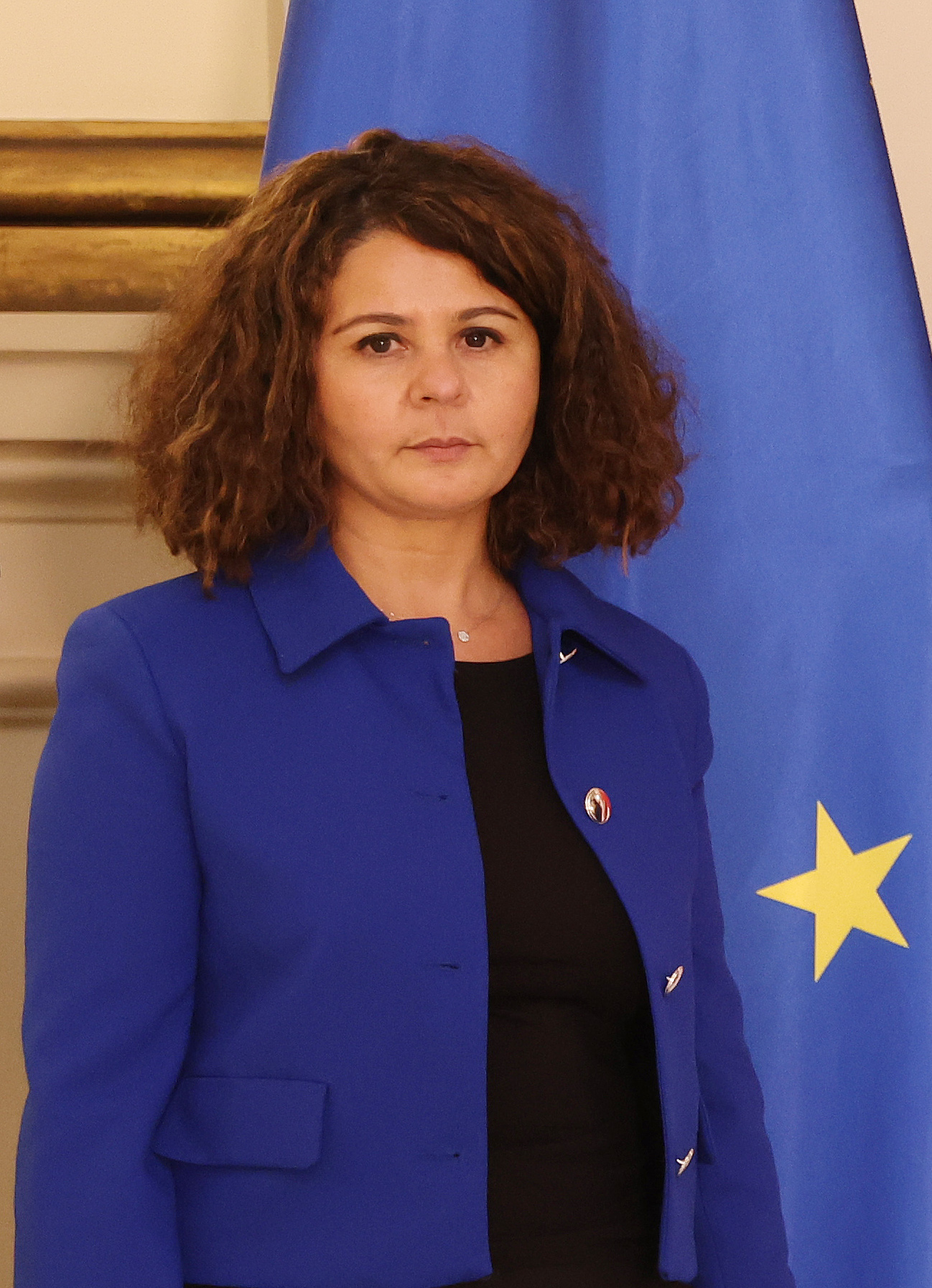
- Incumbent; Sheraz Gasri since 2022
- Appointer: The president
- Inaugural holder: Pierre Morel
- Formation: 1992
- Website: French Embassy - Tbilisi

The ambassador of France to Georgia is France's foremost diplomatic representative in Georgia, and head of France's diplomatic mission in Tbilisi.

List of ambassadors:

Start of term	End of term	Ambassador
1992	1993	Pierre Morel (Residence in Moscow)
1993	1997	Bernard Fassier
1997	2003	Mireille Musso
2003	2004	Salome Zourabichvili
2004	2007	Philippe Lefort
2007	2012	Eric Fournier
2012	2016	Renaud Salins
2016	2019	Pascal Meunier
2019	2022	Diego Colas
2022		Sheraz Gasri
