= Eparchy of Saint Nino =

Coordinates: 48.8408°N 2.2614°E

The Parish of Saint Nino in Paris is an Eastern Orthodox parish under the Ecumenical Patriarchate of Constantinople that comprises orthodox Christians of Georgian descent. It has been part of the Greek Orthodox Metropolis of France since 1977. The parish is named after Saint Nino.

It was founded in 1929 by Georgian refugees after the Red Army invaded their country.

The Georgian Orthodox Parish of Saint Nino in Paris, France, has relationship with Orthodox Church of Georgia but hierarchically depends on Ecumenical Patriarchate of Constantinople according to canon law.

== History ==
- 1922 : one thousand Georgian people (members of Parliament, of Government and of political parties) become refugees in France
- 1929 : a committee (Ilamaz Dadeshkeliani, Josef Kemularia and Levan Zurabishvili) creates the Parish after validation by French authorities and the Ecumenical Patriarchate of Constantinople : the Saint Nino Eparchy at Paris depends on Metropolis of Thyateira (based in London)
- 1977 : the Saint Nino Eparchy at Paris depends on Orthodox Metropolis of France (whose hierarch also presides the Assembly of Orthodox Bishops of France).

== Archpriests of Saint Nino ==
- 1931-1942 : Grigol Peradze
- 1943-1949 : Nikolas Zabakhidze
- 1949- 1988 : Elie Melia
- 1988 : Gabriel Henry
- 1988-1992 : Méthode Alexiou
- From 1992 : Artchil Davrichachvili.
