= Georgian–French day of Leuville-sur-Orge =

Coat of arms of Leuville-sur-Orge

The Georgian–French day of Leuville-sur-Orge, in France was initiated by the Cultural committee of the town, 15 November 2003, by Claude Parmentier -deputy mayor and chairman of the committee-, Luc and Mirian Melua -local French citizens, born in a family of Georgian origin-.

== Background ==
The town of Leuville-sur-Orge welcomed in 1922 members of Parliament and Government of the Democratic Republic of Georgia, after this country was invaded by Russian Red Army. French population and Georgian refugees used to live together for decades. French Senat, Department of Essonne, Canton of Arpajon, town of Leuville-sur-Orge and local population have sought to revive their history after Georgian president Eduard Shevardnadze visits them and before president Mikheil Saakashvili and Giorgi Margvelashvili do it.

== From 2003 to 2005 ==
Under the co-chairing of Claire-Louise Campion -Senator-, Monique Goguelat -deputy President of Department-, Daniel Esprin -Mayor of the town-, and Ambassadors of Georgia in France (Gocha Chogovadze, Natia Japaridze), three yearly Georgian-French day were organized by the Cultural committee.

Claude Kemoularia -Ambassador of France-, General Jean-Pierre Faure -president of the Promotion Dimitri Amilakhvari (French military school Saint Cyr)-, Thamaz Naskhidachvili and Guia Sardjveladze -president and former president of Georgian diaspora in France- participated to the meetings.

Geopolitical and social conferences was held by Professor Jean Radvanyi, Master of conferences Tornike Gordadze and Writer Vassil Karist.

Exhibition stands were held by the airline company Georgian Airways, the bookstore Itinéraires – La Librairie des Voyages and the travel agency Promethea Voyages.

Concert of Georgian polyphonies were held by the Georgian choir Simi, French choirs Madrikali and Mze Shina, singer Nathela.

Between 200 and 300 people participated in these three meetings, in the municipal hall "Florence Leblond".

== After 2006 ==
From 2006 onwards, the Georgian –French Day was organized by Georgian diaspora associations (Georgian Foyer of Leuville, Société civile immobilière du Château, Centre culturel Lazi, Institut Noé Jordania, etc.), with the participation of the Embassy of Georgia in France (Mamuka Kudava, Eka Siradze-Delaunay, Gocha Javakhishvili) and the Municipality of Leuville-sur-Orge (Eric Braive).

The polyphonic concerts were continued.

Georgian cooking workshops were given in the kitchen of the Georgian Castle as well as historical interviews (former professor Charles Urjewicz, childhood memories of people who lived at the Georgian Castle,...).

== See also ==
- Leuville cemetery
- Benia Chkhikvishvili
