= Mirian Melua =

French-Georgian engineer and journalist

Mirian Melua (Georgian: მირიან მელუა; French: Mirian Méloua; born 28 April 1942) is a French-Georgian engineer and journalist. After a professional career in information systems, he became an expert on Georgian issues with French ministerial institutions and media.

== Early life ==
Melua was born in a small village near Paris, Leuville-sur-Orge, where a part of Georgian political emigration settled in 1922 after the Red Army invaded the Democratic Republic of Georgia. He grew up with a Georgian mother and father, an older brother, Luc, and a younger sister, Elen. He was baptized according to Orthodox Christian practices. His godmother was Veronique Cheidze, the daughter of Nikolay Cheidze, a figure of the February Revolution and the Democratic Republic of Georgia—he would hand over the diplomatic passport of Nikolay Cheidze, Speaker of the Parliament of Georgia from 1918 to 1921, to Irakli Kobakhidze, Speaker of the Parliament of Georgia on 15 January 2019, in Paris. Melua's godfather was Shalva Skamkochaishvili, president of the Georgian Association in France. He was naturalized at age 14. After graduating high school, he studied mathematics and physics at the University of Paris, where he obtained a master's degree. He was called to military service and served for 18 months in the French Forces in Germany.

== Career ==
=== Information systems ===
Melua had a scientific, technical, and business career in the field of information systems in four companies, IBM; Brown, Boveri & Cie; Banque Populaire; and BNP Paribas. In the late 1960s and early 1970s, his first jobs were to improve the real-time analysis of mass-spectrometry methods in IBM's French development laboratory (located in Corbeil-Essonnes) and the radar guidance of French rocket-tracking in Guiana (located in Kourou). In the early 1980s, he was appointed the director of information systems. At Brown Bovery France, he installed the management application of electric motors deliveries one day after the order. Later, at Banque Populaire, he merged the information systems of five local banks. At Groupe BNP, he was in charge of the retail banking general information system for France, before being nominated as the general secretary for Information System and Organization. In the 1990s, he joined Groupe BNP Switzerland and set up information systems for three subsidiaries—UEB, BNP, and Paribas—in corporate and institutional banking and in market activities.

=== Journalism ===
Melua received his first official press card in 1959 from a regional newspaper, La Gazette de l’Île-de-France, led by journalists Jean Poilvet and Joseph Barsalou from the French Resistance. He received his most recent official press card in 2017 from the Année francophone internationale, an institution working with the Organisation internationale de la Francophonie and the École supérieure de journalisme de Lille. He formerly wrote articles for newspapers such as Usine nouvelle and AGEFI.

In October 2003, he founded a monthly newsletter, Les Infos Brèves France Géorgie, for diplomats, companies, academics, students, artists, athletes, and the general public. The 182nd newsletter was published in December 2018.

He participates in several publications in Tbilisi, such as La Vie en Géorgie and Agenda Georgia. He also contributes to Regard sur l’Est in Paris.

=== Expert in Georgian issues ===
From 2004 to 2014, he was an administrator of the Comité de Liaison pour la Solidarité avec l’Europe de l’Est, a non-governmental organization working on Eastern European issues funded by the French Ministry of Foreign Affairs. He was in charge of Georgian issues.

From 2007 to 2019, for the Année Francophone internationale, he published the annual report on Georgia, which includes chapters on politics, the economy, society, culture, and science.

In 2013 and 2014, he was nominated to be a consultant for Georgian immigration in the French Ministry of the Interior, the Office français de protection des réfugiés et apatrides. He validated the files of Georgian refugees in France from 1924 to 1952 before online publications. He explained the process during a conference at the Musée de l'Immigration in Paris.

== Books ==
- 2004, La Libération d’Arpajon, en prélude à la Libération de Paris, 22 aout 1944, Art et histoire du Pays de Châtres Bulletin N°29
- 2005, Country guide, Petit Futé Géorgie, ISBN 2-7469-1116-7
- 2012, Les Maisons de la place du Marché d’Arpajon, Art et Histoire du Pays de Châtres, ISSN 1773-2670:
- 2017, Réfugiés et apatrides. De la nationalité géorgienne au statut d’apatride d’origine géorgienne, Presses universitaires de Rennes, ISBN 978-2-7535-5486-3

== Awards ==
- 1973, 1975 and 1978, Systems Engineering Professional Excellence Awards, from IBM World Trade, work on information systems
- 2013, Office français de protection des réfugiés et apatrides award, work on Georgian immigration

== See also ==
- Government of the Democratic Republic of Georgia in Exile
- Georgians in France
- Georgian–French day of Leuville-sur-Orge
- Leuville cemetery
