= Giorgi Gvazava =

Georgian jurist, writer, and politician

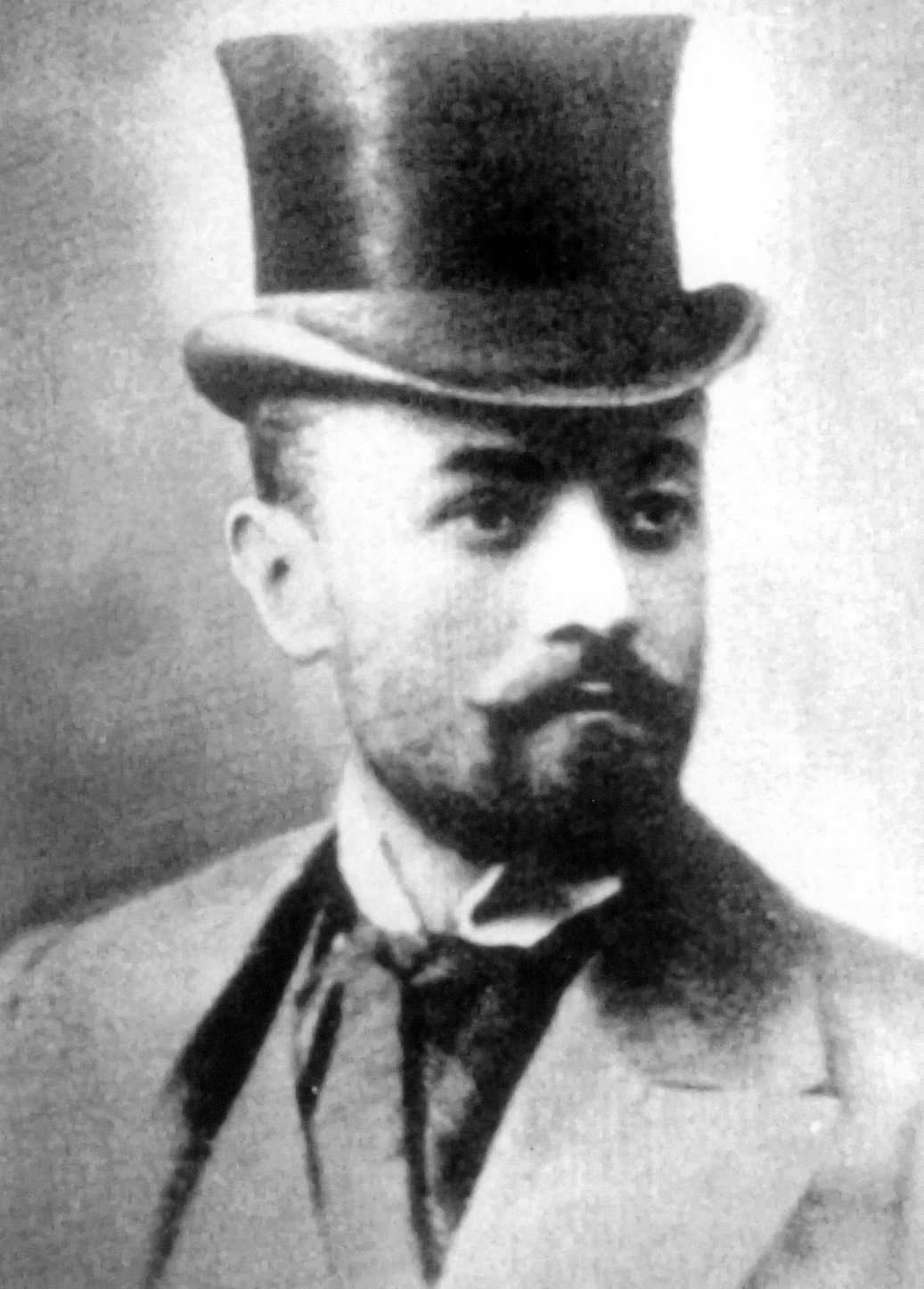
Gvazava G

Giorgi Gvazava (Georgian: გიორგი გვაზავა) (23 April 1869 – 20 January 1941) was a Georgian jurist, writer and politician; one of the founding members of the Georgian National Democratic Party.

Born in the village of Nokalakevi in western Georgia, then under the Russian Empire, Gvazava's became involved in politics early in the 1890s when he was among the organizers of the Freedom League (თავისუფლების ლიგა, t’avisup’lebis liga), which coordinated Georgian student groups in the universities of the empire. He also published lyrics and wrote for local press. Later, he was a founding member of the Georgian National Democratic Party, more like a group in its early days, in 1906. Centered on various newspapers, the best known of which was klde (კლდე; "Rock"), the party held its founding congress in June 1917, in the aftermath of the February Revolution in St. Petersburg. Gvazava was a member of the Georgian National Council and its presidium. After Georgia's declaration of independence (26 May 1918), Gvazava was elected to the Constituent Assembly and headed the National Democratic faction there. The 1921 Red Army invasion of Georgia forced Gvazava into exile to Paris where he died in 1941.

Gvazava authored works on the politics and international relations of Georgia. He also translated into Georgian Sophocles’s Antigone (1912), Prometheus (1935), Crébillon’s Rhadamiste et Zénobie (1929), and Racine’s Mithridate (1934). In 1938, together with Anie Marcel-Paon, Gvazava produced a French translation in prose of the medieval Georgian epic The Knight in the Panther's Skin (L'homme à la peau de léopard) by Shota Rustaveli.
