= Elie Melia =

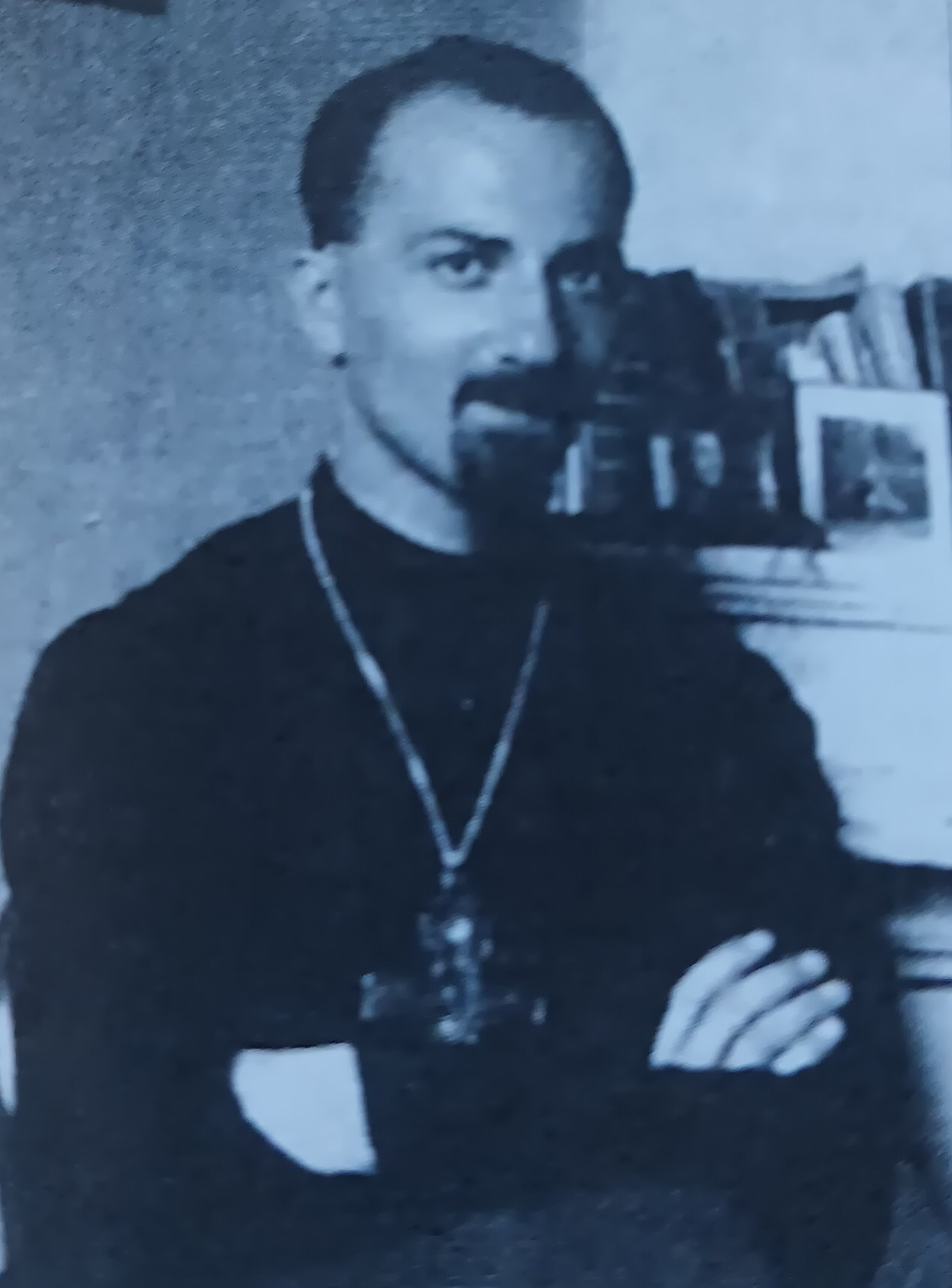
Image of Elie Melia

Fr. Elie Melia (Georgian: ილია მელია, French: Élie Mélia) (20 February 1915 – 15 March 1988) was a Georgian Orthodox priest in France and church historian.

Born in Kutaisi, he fled the Soviet regime to Western Europe with his brother and his sister, after Red Army invaded Georgia in 1921.

== Refugee to Belgium ==
He studies in a Jesuit College before joining the University of Namur on philosophy and literature subjects.

One 12 June 1943, he married Alla Melnikova, a Belgium citizen who was the daughter of a Russian general.

== Refugee to France ==
After study in St. Sergius Orthodox Theological Institute at Paris, he became a priest in August 1943.

He is sent to Orthodox Parish at Belfort, on the East part of France where Russian speaking refugees are working (Société alsacienne de constructions métalliques and Peugeot); he takes place in French Resistance against German Occupation; fifty soviet prisoners caught by German army are hidden in the parish and can escape. In 1945, he serves at the St. Seraphim of Sarov Church at Colombelles, on the West of France where Russian speaking refugees are also working (Société métallurgique de Normandie).

From June 1949 to March 1988, he serves at the Georgian Orthodox Eparchy of Saint Nino at Paris, depending on Ecumenical Patriarchate of Constantinople by Assembly of Orthodox Bishops of France: he became closely associated with local Georgian emigrated community.

He participated in the French Christian Oecumenical Movement and was a representative of French Orthodox Church in different committees, for instance, speaking the Sunday morning on French national radio. He also participated in the Russian Student Christian Movement.

He taught church history and theology at St. Sergius Orthodox Theological Institute, and was the author and coauthor of several works on Eastern Orthodoxy and the Georgian Orthodox Church.
