= Michel Mouskhely =

Georgian-French political scientist and jurist

Michel Mouskhely (Mouskheli) born Mikheil Muskhelishvili (Georgian: მიხეილ მუსხელიშვილი) (8 July 1903 – 11 July 1964) was a Georgian-French political scientist and jurist.

Born in Tbilisi, Georgia, then part of Russian Empire, Muskheli emigrated to Western Europe following the Red Army invasion of Georgia in 1921. He then studied at Göttingen, Munich, Lyons, and Paris. After his brief work for the University of Paris (1932–33), he lectured at the University of Cairo from 1935 to 1948. In 1948, he became a Professor of International Law and of Political and Economic Sciences at the University of Strasbourg. Mouskhely organized and directed a center for Soviet studies at the Strasbourg law faculty which began in 1960 publication of abstracts from the principal Soviet periodicals dealing with the social sciences. Mouskhely wrote a number of works on federalism, and drafted, together with Professor Gaston Stefani, a 1948 European federal constitution which was submitted to the International Coordinating Committee of the Movements for European Unity, but had no direct effect on the latter's work.

== Biography ==
In 1921, he emigrated after the invasion of Georgian territory by the armies of Russian Soviet Federative Socialist Republic and began university studies in Göttingen, Munich, Lyon, and Paris.

After teaching for a year at the University of Paris (1932–1933), he became a professor at the French School in Cairo and a lecturer at Cairo University (1935–1948).

He was then appointed professor at the Faculty of Law and Economics at the University of Strasbourg, where he founded and directed the Research Center on the USSR and Eastern European Countries, which in 1960 began publishing summaries of the main Soviet periodicals on the social sciences.

A visiting professor at various American universities, he is the author of numerous books and journals (L’Europe en formation) and also a federalist activist, co-founder of the Interuniversity Federalist Union, president of the Association of European Academics, president of the Assises du Congrès du peuple européen (Altiero Spinelli) and vice-president of the International Center for European Training (Alexandre Marc).

He drafted a European federal constitution, which was presented to the International Coordinating Committee of Movements for European Unity.
